= Desyatinny Monastery =

Ancient monastery in Russia

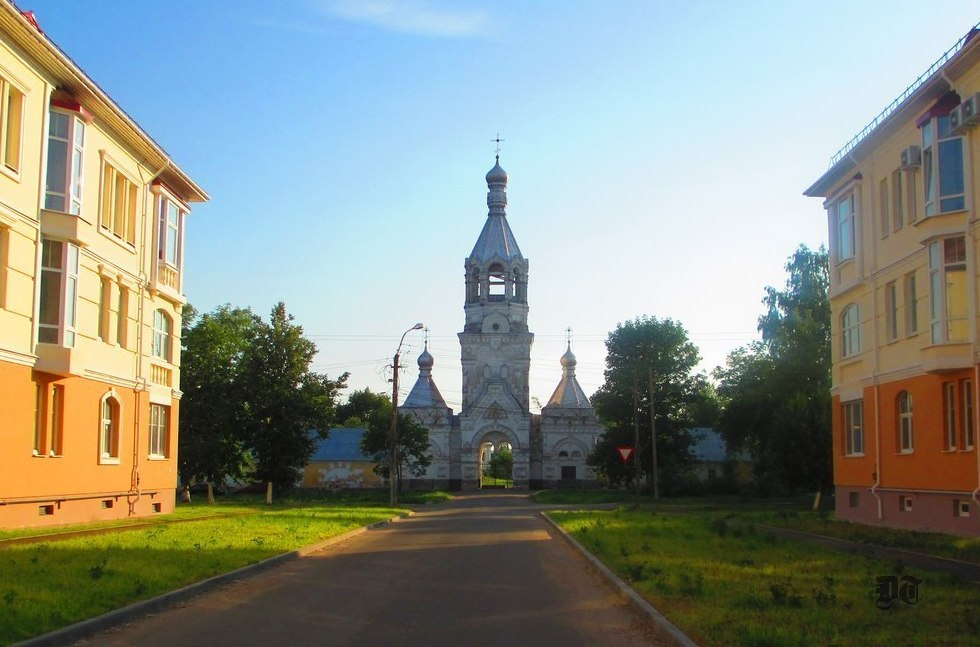
- The main entrance through the bell tower, July 2013

Location
- Location: Russia, Veliky Novgorod
- Interactive map of Desyatinny Monastery
- Coordinates: 58°31′04″N 31°15′54″E

Architecture
- Style: Eclecticism
- Groundbreaking: 1327 (first written reference)
- Completed: 1902

Website
- http://artmus.natm.ru/

The Desyatinny Monastery (Russian: Десяти́нный монастырь) is an inactive monastery or convent in Veliky Novgorod (Russia), one of eight ancient monasteries of the Novgorod Republic.

The Desyatinny Monastery now has a regular square-shaped perimeter. The monastery's complex was developed over a lengthy period and now includes objects constructed in periods from the 14th to the 20th centuries. It was finally completed at the beginning of the 20th century but was closed in 1918 by the Soviet government. Some buildings, including both churches and part of the monastery wall, were lost in the 20th century during World War II and the anti-religious campaign, with the result that the monastery is preserved fragmentarily.

Never considered particularly important, it was subjected to rebuilding many times. Built to symbolize and immortalize the miracle of historical significance for the Novgorod Republic, until the present day, the monastery in fact has undertaken certain social functions affecting Novgorodian society. Its history is a story of ups and downs, of ruin and reconstruction. Almost nothing in the present monastery's exterior suggests how ancient the monastery really is.

== Name ==
Znamenie, the miraculous icon

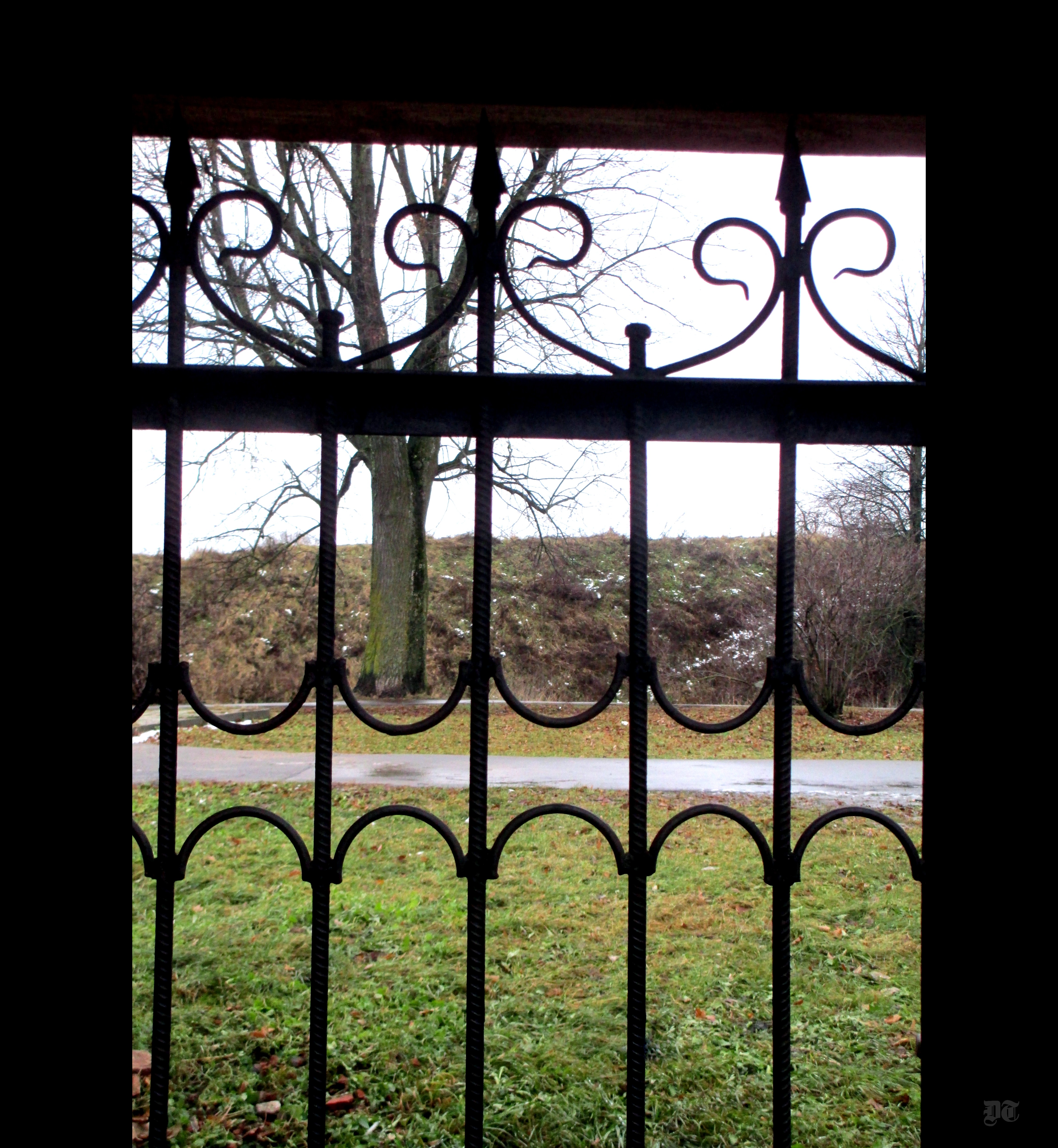
The place of the miracle through the grid of the monastery's portal, December 2014

The formal name of the monastery is the monastery of the Nativity of Our Lady on the Desyatina, where Desyatina might be calqued into English with the word tithe. It is hard to establish exactly what the founder meant by Desyatina (“Tithe”), as it had several meanings in Old East Slavic, but the most widely accepted version is that the monastery was founded on an estate previously owned by the princes of Novgorod called Desyatina. (“Tithe”) In turn, Desyatinny is simply an adjectival form created by suffixes (it is remarkable, that the old-fashioned variant of the name is the adjective with another suffix: Desyatinski.) It is therefore assumed that the princes of Novgorod presented their land, glorified in 1170 by the miracle, to the church.

== History ==
=== Founding ===
It is not clear exactly when the monastery was established. The first written reference in the Novgorod First Chronicle states that in 1327 Moses the archbishop erected a church in honour of the Nativity of Our Lady on the Tithe. An extract from the official translation of the chronicle by Mitchell et al. is given below in comparison with the original text in the Old Novgorod dialect of Old East Slavic:

"Vladyka Moisei erected the church of the Nativity of the Holy Mother of God in the Desyatina"

____________________

"постави церковь святои Богородици Рождество владыка Моисеи в Десятине" (Old East Slavic language)

-Novgorod First Chronicle

The reference simply shows that the monastery existed in 1327 but does not state when it was founded. Another fact which helps to establish when the monastery was founded is the icon called The Cloudy Assumption: it is accepted that this icon from the early 13th century was brought to Moscow from the monastery's iconostasis. It can therefore be concluded that the monastery was probably founded at the turn of the 12th century.

The version that links the period when the monastery was founded to the miracle which took place on its grounds is likely to be the most significant: in 1170, when Novgorod was besieged by the army of Andrei Bogolubsky, the citizens won a miraculous victory not far from the monastery (the particular site of the miracle, the rampart behind the monastery, is still preserved quite well). It is therefore probably that the monastery was founded soon after the miracle occurred, in order to symbolize and immortalize it. The subsequent history of the monastery is a story of ups and downs.

=== Early history: the republican period ===
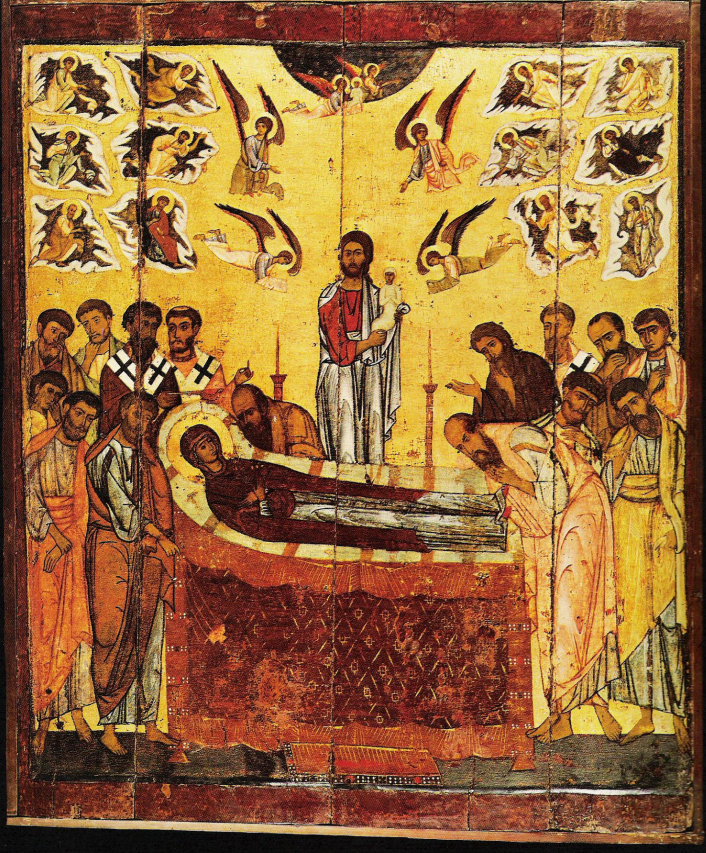
The Cloudy Assumption (ca. 1200). The icon from Desyatinny monastery

There was no united Russian state when the monastery was founded, whatever the precise year happens to be. Instead, There were various East Slavic feudal states. The monastery was founded in the capital of the Novgorod Republic, the most economically, politically and socially developed of these. There are written sources in the Novgorod chronicles, inventory acts and other documents, which give an idea of the early history of the monastery. It can therefore be asserted that the monastery was not substantially developed from the time when its main church of stone was built in 1397 until the end of Swedish occupation of Novgorod in 1617.

In the republican period, the main church of stone was in the monastery's centre, with the remaining wooden buildings around it. The particular set of wooden buildings might have changed over the time but they seems to have included some separate abbess's apartments, some cells, auxiliary buildings and outbuildings (a kitchen, sheds, some stables), probably surrounded by a wooden fence. As in all European towns built of inflammable materials, the wooden buildings were burned down several times (most significantly in 1466 and 1541).

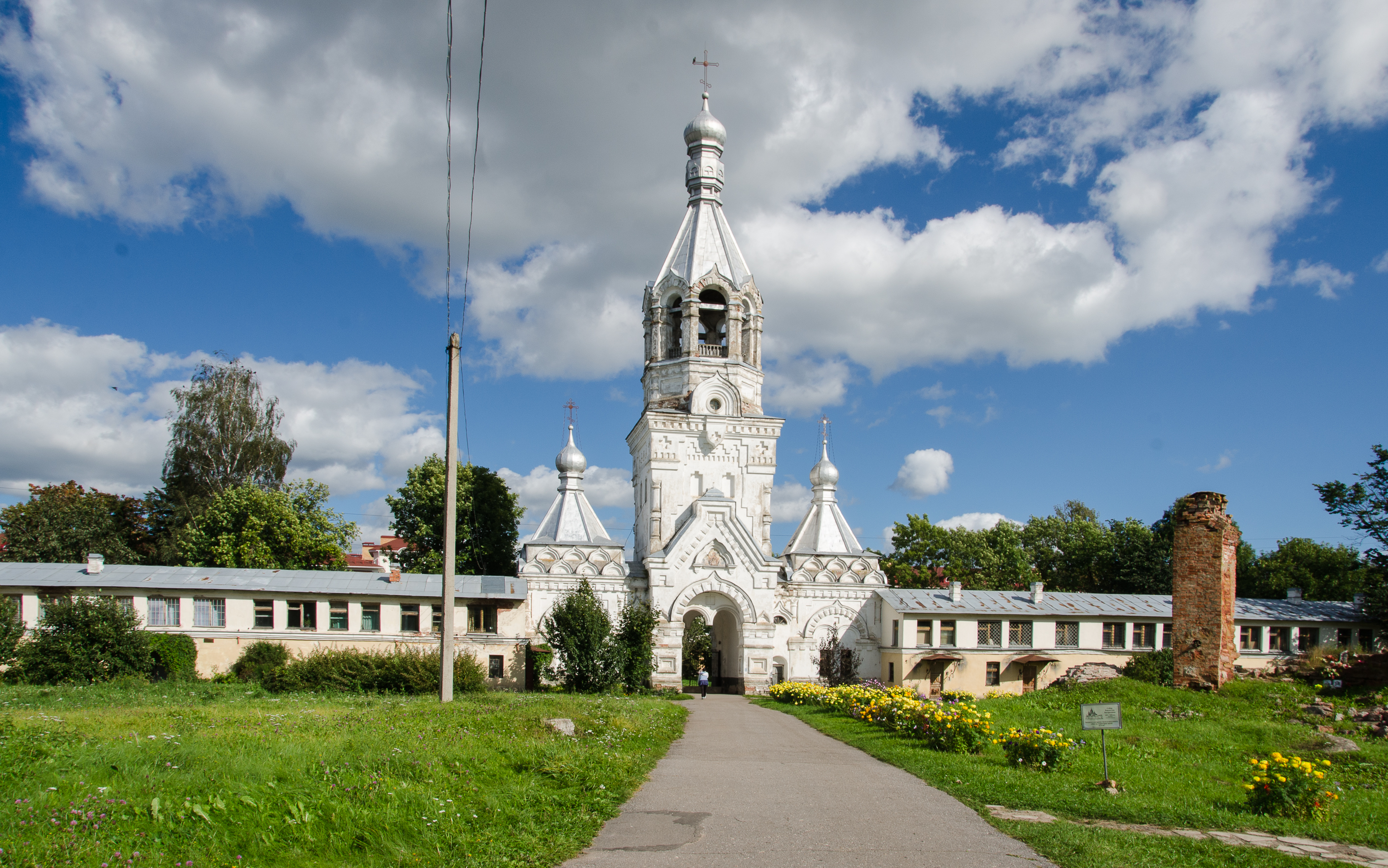
Monastery of the Tithes is a cultural heritage of the ancient Novgorodian Rusi

The monastery was never considered particularly significant despite the fact that it was located in the capital of Novgorod Republic. As a result:

- at that time (and later) it was not a large property comparable with important monasteries in Russia and in the West. It is known to have possessed two uyezds in Vodskaya pyatina (German name: Wattlande), the territory in the modern Novgorod and Leningrad regions of Russia; this is quite a modest estate compared to other monasteries;
- the monastic regulations initially were not strict;
- the monastery seems to have been an institution which assumed several other functions. For example, the report about damages caused by fire in 1466 tells us that an ambassador of Pskov Republic lived in the monastery at the time and, moreover, that there were wooden barracks for guards at the monastery. The monastery seems to have managed to maintain various functions to this day as it now serves artists and publicity interests.

=== Modern history: under the crown of All Rus ===
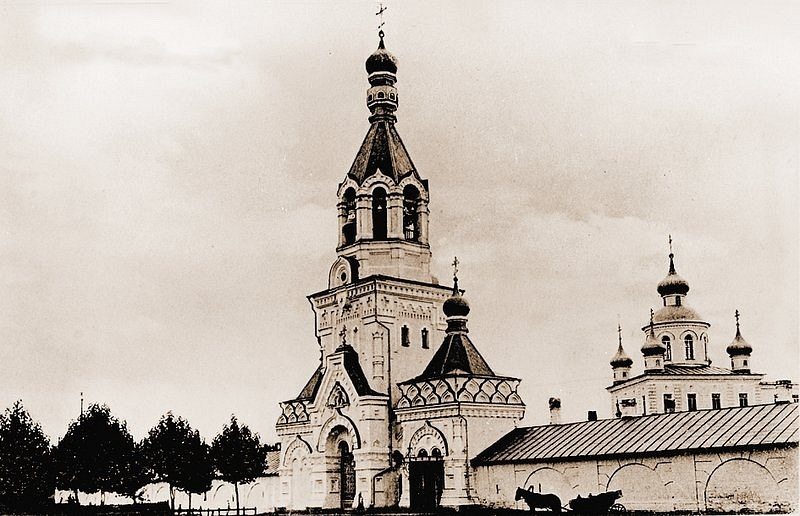
Desyatinny monastery, beginning of the 20th century

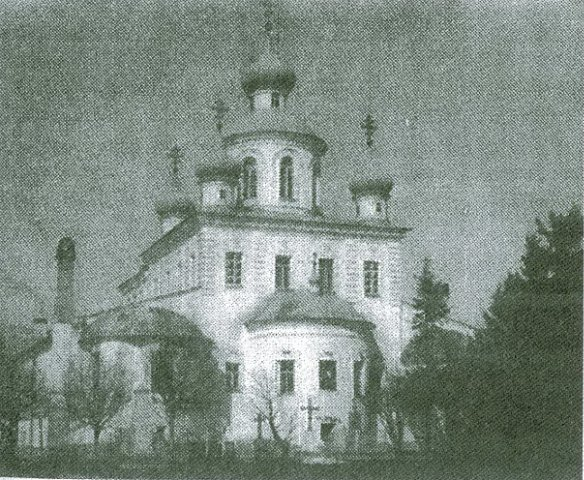
The Church of the Nativity, beginning of the 20th century

A black stripe in the monastery's history starts with the dawnfall of Novgorod Republic in 1470. It is known that the monastery lost all its land when it was appropriated by Ivan III of Russia personally. In 1495 the monastery still owned a small estate in the modern Parfinsky District of Novgorod Oblast. A hundred years later, Moscow undertook the bloody massacre in Novgorod in 1570, and all the monasteries in Novgorod, including this one, were subjected to defeat by Ivan the Terrible and his men, the monks - to violence and humiliation:

"Every day he [ Ivan the Terrible ] mounted and moved to another monastery, where he indulged his savagery. His men took money, ransacked cells, tore down bells, destroyed equipment, and slaughtered cattle. They beat abbots and elders on their heels with sticks [...] demanding extra from them. The sack ruined the monks, and the priceless artifacts of St. Sophia cathedral went into Ivan's fisc. [...] He confiscated treasure in twenty-seven of the oldest monasteries"

-Sergei Soloviev, Anthony Rheinlander. History of Russia: The Reign of Ivan the Terrible, Kazan, Astrakhan, Livonia, the Oprichnina and the Polotsk Campaign

Unfortunately, it was not the end. The greatest defeat in the monastery's history took place during the Swedish occupation of Novgorod in 1611 – 1617. As far as can be ascertained, the Swedes defeated the monastery, burned all buildings of wood, including fence and cells, and destroyed the only building of stone - the church of the Nativity:

"The church of stone is defeated and collapsing [now], and there're no cells, no fence"

____________________

"Церков каменная разорена и разваливается, а келий, ограды нет" (Early Modern Russian language)

-The inventory of Novgorod, 1617

A new period for reconstruction and development came with the new dynasty which favoured the monastery. After the defeat by the Swedes, in 1618 Euphrosyne the abbess visited Moscow to ask Michael I of Russia, the first sovereign from the new dynasty, for funding. The visit resulted in a positive decision: the tsar provided not only money but new land tenures. That was likely to be a lesson taught by the monastery – Oulita, the next abbess, was a very influential woman from a rich family, who had important contacts at the royal court, resulting in a period of prosperity during the reign of Alexis of Russia. In 1671, in response to Oulita's request, the tsar provided the monastery with further benefits:

- guards to protect the monastery's land tenures from neighbouring landowners;
- release from taxes and duties for the nuns;
- a vehicle for an abbess visiting Moscow, and funding of travel expenses from the Moscow treasury;
- funding to repair the church.

One other rich inhabitant who settled in the monastery at the same period was a boyar from an ancient Novgorodian family of nobles. It was the widow Agatha Anichkova, who granted to the monastery all her estate (over 2,000 tithes as well as about 400 serfs). This greatly improved the monastery's humble stocks of 340 tithes and 400 serfs, and allowed the monastery modest means for undertaking reconstruction of the main church in 1679. As before, the monastery renewed its social activity, taking in old and disabled people who arrived from all over Russia. From the 18th century, a women's prison was located within the holy walls, and women-prisoners under the surveillance of guards lived together with the nuns.

The prosperity did not last long. The monastery again lost all its land tenures when in 1764 Catherine II issued the act on secularization of monastery estates. The only exception for the monastery were two windmills near Novgorod together with the monastery's continued right to catch fish in the Msta river. To some extent, this was attenuated by the decision to merge the Desyatinny and the Varvarinsky monasteries (the unpreserved monastery in Novgorod). As a result, all the assets of the Varvarinky monastery were transferred to the Desyatinny monastery. This also brought about a sharp increase in population: there were nine sisters in the monastery before the reform but in 1864 there were as many as 17. (and the total population including 53 novices is 140)

Gradually, up to the beginning of the 20th century, the monastery became better-off. Assessed in 1764 as second-class, its status later improved. In 1864 its annual income was 5,255.65 roubles (quite a large sum) and it had 24,000 roubles in its bank account. One more profitable deal was made with the Russian government in the 20th century: after the monastery had transferred some of its land tenures to the government to house a military settlement, it was given an additional grant of 1,000 roubles a year. Financial stability provided for renewal of the monastery's architecture at the turn of the century.

The revolution in 1917 put an end to the monastery's development as a religious institution as well as an architectural site as a result of the anti-religious campaign undertaken by the new government in 1919.

=== Contemporary history ===
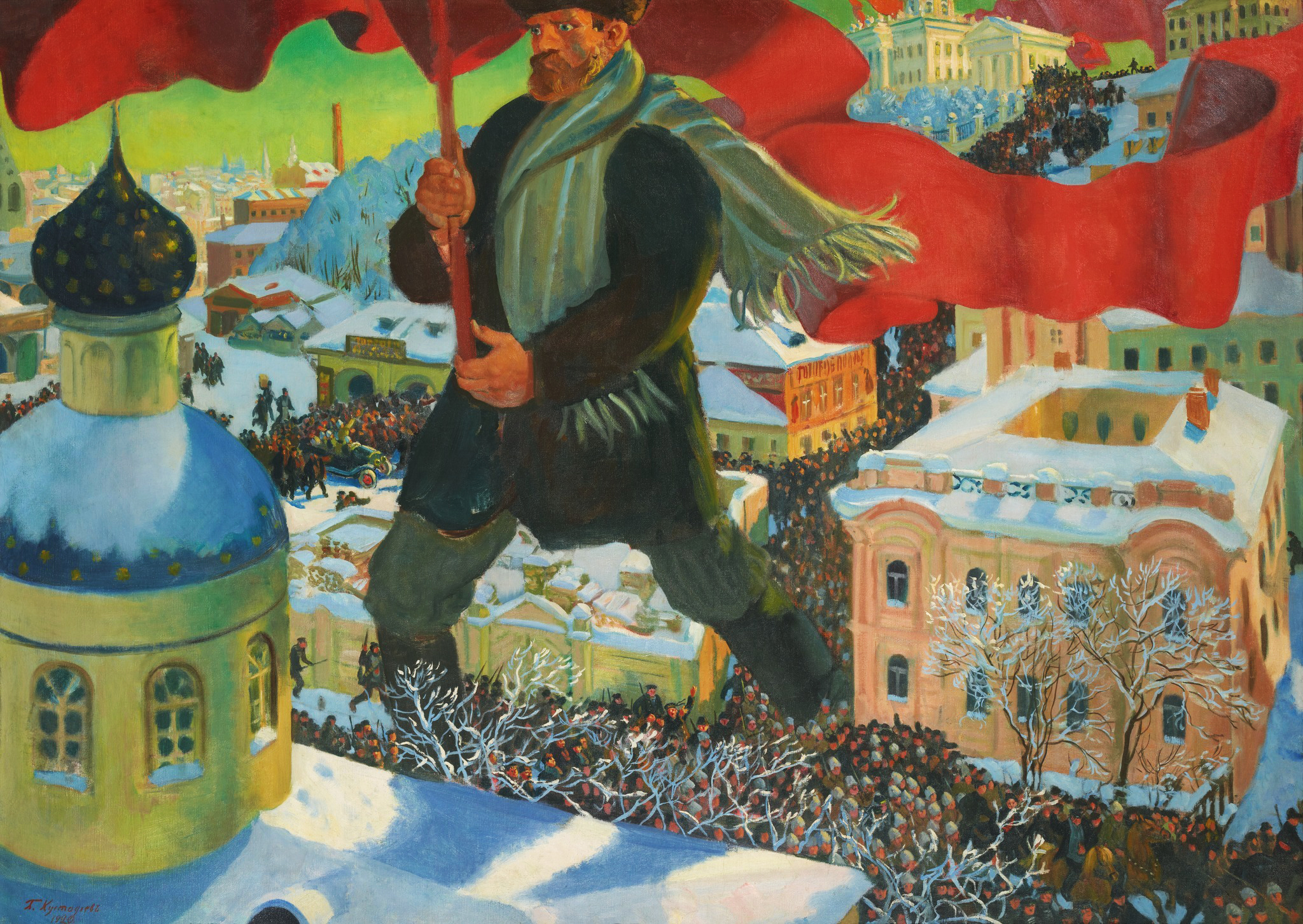
Bolshevik by Boris Kustodiev (1920). Virtually, the allegory of the monastery's fate

After the October Revolution the monastery shared the fate of other Russian monasteries. Funds in its bank accounts were appropriated by the government in 1918. Not yet realizing the scale of what occurred, the sisters applied to different institutions, proposing the creation of a body called the Union of monasticism's adherents:

[Appropriation of property] «is convicted according to international law of other countries by a proper court. <…> A historical monument, a beauty and a greatness of ancient Novgorod, the Desyatinny monastery should not be allowed to become collapsed”

____________________

[Присвоение собственности] "по международному праву других государств осуждается надлежащим судом. <…> Как исторический памятник, красота и величие древнего Новгорода, Десятинный монастырь не должен быть отдан на разрушение» (Russian language)

-The extract from the application by the sisters to Novgorod Spiritual Consistory, 1918

Nevertheless, a prescription to place a telegraph within the monastery's walls was issued on December 27, 1918, but it was not implemented as the sisters refused to leave. According to a letter from Abbess Lyudmila, military organizations were placed inside the holy walls temporarily in 1919. The monastery was liquidated the same year according to the decision of a new city council, the estate was nationalized, and the church attributes were transferred to the congregation. The Emergency commission occupied the monastery in 1919, and the abbesses with the nuns were strongly urged to leave the holy walls; a club for chekists was arranged inside the abbess's chamber. One more prescription to leave the monastery within three days was taken on August 12, 1919, but once again it was not executed: the abbess together with the sisters asked tearfully to prolong their dwelling till August 20, 1919. That day was the final one: after Lyudmila and the sisters had had prayers and an emotional speech by Alexander Oustinsky, the priest, they said goodbye to each other and dispersed. The story may be considered sad, but it was not tragic as in the rest Russia where monks were frequently executed.

In February 1920, a concentration camp for young Poles and some other groups of people was arranged there; according to a report by F. Amosov, the chief of forced labour department, his "general impression of the camp is nighmarish".

Serious damage to the monastery's complex was caused while Novgorod was occupied for the second time in its history during World War II. Damage resulted in the east cells (its east part was damaged), the bell tower (it lost its roof and domes), the monastery wall (some parts were entirely destroyed, and in some parts there were shell holes), and, above all, the church. The limited funding of the reconstruction caused delays until 1975. By then, the ruins of the main church were torn down by locals for the bricks. The church was therefore not included in reconstruction work. All the other buildings were reconstructed in 1975 – 1983: entirely or, if necessary, partly.

Today the grounds and the buildings are occupied by the Union of Artists, the museum of Novgorod Art Culture and workshops for artists.

== Monastery complex ==
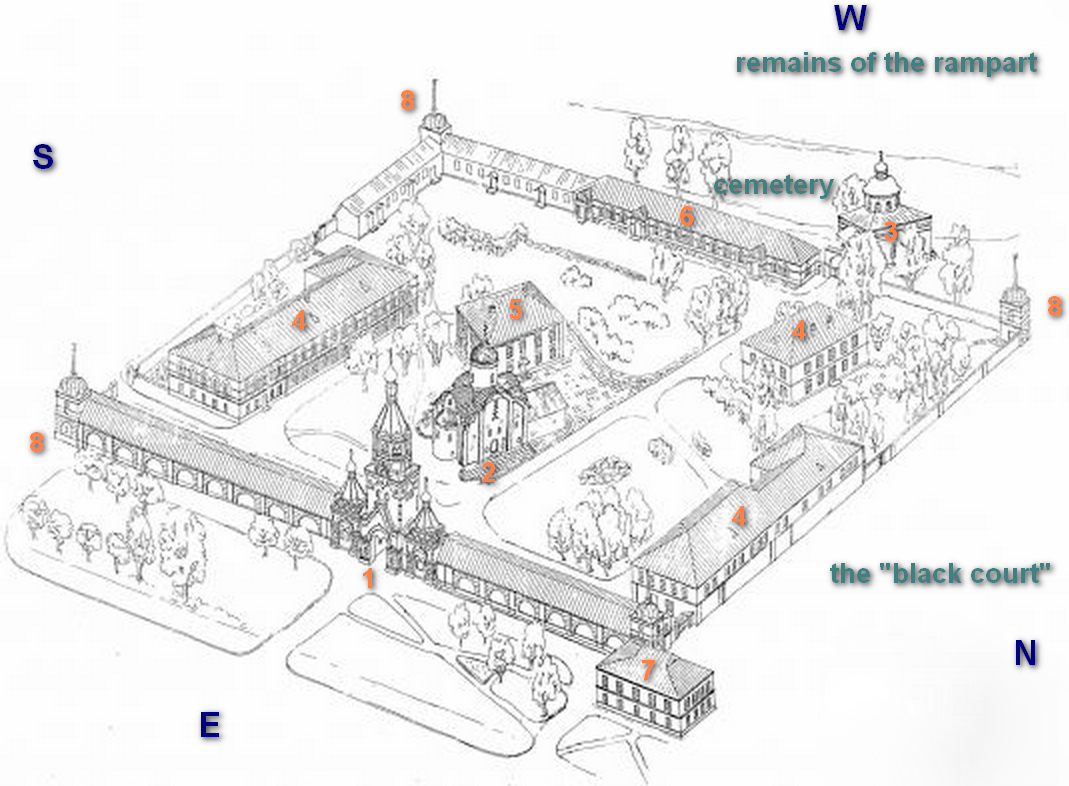
The monastery complex: (1) the bell tower and the east wall with cells (2) the church of the Nativity (now in ruins) (3) the church of All Hollows (lost) (4) the quarters of cells - 2 (5) the abbess chamber (6) the west wall with functional rooms (7) the monastery hotel (8) the corner towers

First, it is reasonable to make two points about the monastery complex, resulting from the conditions of the monastery's development described above:

- most of the ancient buildings in the monastery were made of wood and were not preserved after fire and as a result of rot;
- the buildings in the modern monastery complex are from various periods; the modern monastery complex developed from the 14th to the 20th century;
- the modern monastery complex from the 20th century is preserved fragmentarily. The monastery has lost its two churches and part of the monastery wall during the 20th century.

The modern monastery complex includes:

- the ruins of the church of the Nativity of Our Lady;
- the bell tower;
- the eastern monastery wall up to the bell tower with cells inside;
- the western monastery wall with functional rooms inside.
- the abbess chamber in its south part;
- three cell houses;
- the building outside the monastery's perimeter.

Today the monastery is a regular square-shaped property with the main church (in ruins) at the centre, and all the remaining buildings along the perimeter. The regular shape stems from the 19th century, defined by the monastery wall, constructed in 1814 – 1820. The corners of the monastery's perimeter are finished with small towers with wind vanes which now squeak while turning, providing with a special atmosphere to the site.

=== The Church of the Nativity of Our Lady ===
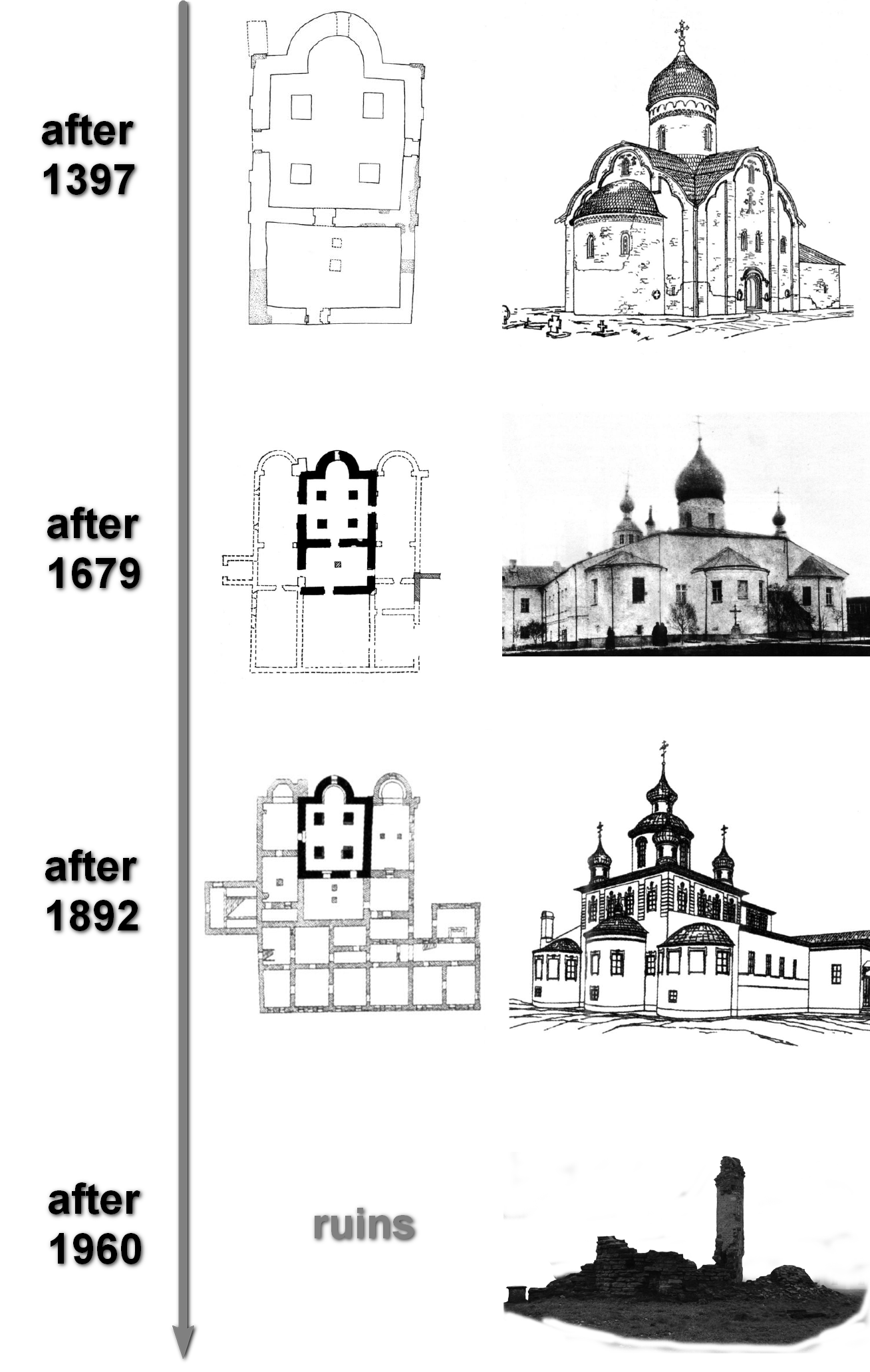
The church of the Nativity of Our lady: the transformations through its history

The Church of the Nativity of Our Lady was the most ancient building in the monastery. According to Novgorod First Chronicle, it was erected in 1397 to replace an existing church (probably - of wood) built in 1327, but Novgorod Fourth Chronicle gives the year of founding as 1329 (not 1327):

"In the year 6835 [ 1329 ] Svyatoslavlya the duchess erected the church of the Holy Mother of God in the Desyatina

____________________

"В лето 6835 постави княгиня Святославля церков святоую Богородицю на Десятине" (Old East Slavic language, adopted writing)

-Novgorod Fourth Chronicle

The archeological excavations aimed at discovering the original design of the 14th century church took place in 1960 and 1973. Stylistically, the original church was a typical one for Novgorod Republic: an ascetic church built in the cross-in-square tradition, square-shaped, with a dome, an apse and two aisles (the first was in honour of the nativity of St. John the Baptist, the second, in honour of St. Panteleimon). It was red. Like many other churches of the period, the church is built in honour of the Nativity of Mary, who was believed to be a patron of Novgorod.

Russian archeologists Ninelle Kuzmina and Dmitry Petrov claim that in the 17th century the church's upper part was replaced. The reasons are that the church was destroyed by the Swedes during the Swedish occupation of Novgorod in 1611 - 1617. As a result, Euphrosyne the abbess visited Moscow in 1618 to ask Michael I of Russia for funding. The visit was positive, providing funding for substantial repairs. There is some evidences of the results:

"There's the stone temple of the Nativity of the Holy Fairest Virgin in the Desyatinski female monastery, there're singings there [i.e. a choir performs songs], and there're cells near this temple. But there's no any fence near this monastery"

____________________

В Десятинском девиче монастыре храм Рождество пречистыя Богородицы камменой, пенье есть, да у того ж храму келья. А ограды около монастыря нет никакой. (Early Modern Russian language)

-The extract from the inventory act, 1632

The reconstruction was continued by Oulita the abbess, who had important connections at the royal court. She undertook a serious reconstruction of the church in 1679. As a result, in 1740 the church was described as follows:

"The church of the Nativity of the Holy Virgin is of stone, it has 2 aisles, of stone too: the one in honour of the Sign of Our Lady is hot [ i.e. provided with a heating system ], the other one in honour of Panteleimon the martyr is cold [ i.e. without a heating ]. All this building is 10 fathoms in length, and 8 fathoms in width. The roof is covered with boards of wood, the domes – with scale-shaped wood; a porch with rood of wooden desks is near the church. There's a bell tower of wood near that church"

____________________

"Церковь рождества пресвятыя Богородицы каменная, при ней 2 придела, каменные же: Знамения Пресвятой Богородицы тёплый, и св. великомученика Пантелеймона холодный; все оное здание длинною на 10, а шириною на 8 сажень. Кровли крыты тёсом, а главы обиты чешуею досчатою; при церкви с северных дверей приделана паперть и крылец деревянный, крытый тёсом. При той церкви колокольня деревянная". (Russian language)

-The extract from the description by Macarius the archbishop, 1740

The most thorough alteration of the church which distorted the ancient building completely was undertaken in 1889 – 1892 by Agnia the abbess. The rebuilding was aimed at enlarging the church. It was turned into a two-storey building, and the ancient part, now the first floor of the new construction, was encompassed by new outbuildings. All walls and columns of the ancient construction above the level of the first floor were disassembled and assembled. The second range of windows was built on above. The church was turned into a five-domed structure with the shape of domes being typical for the period. The abbess chamber was now joined to the church as an outbuilding.

The church was seriously destroyed while Novgorod was under the occupation during World War II, but it maintained its central volume (the ancient part), roof and the central dome. After the partial cave-in occurred in 1946, the remains lost its roof and the central dome. Afterwards, the church retained its central walls for a decade, but in the middle of 1950 it was disassembled into bricks by locals. In 1960, archeological excavations took place. Today only a few ruins remain. In 1997 plans for reconstruction were developed, but have not yet been carried out because the local government has not funded it.

=== Other objects ===
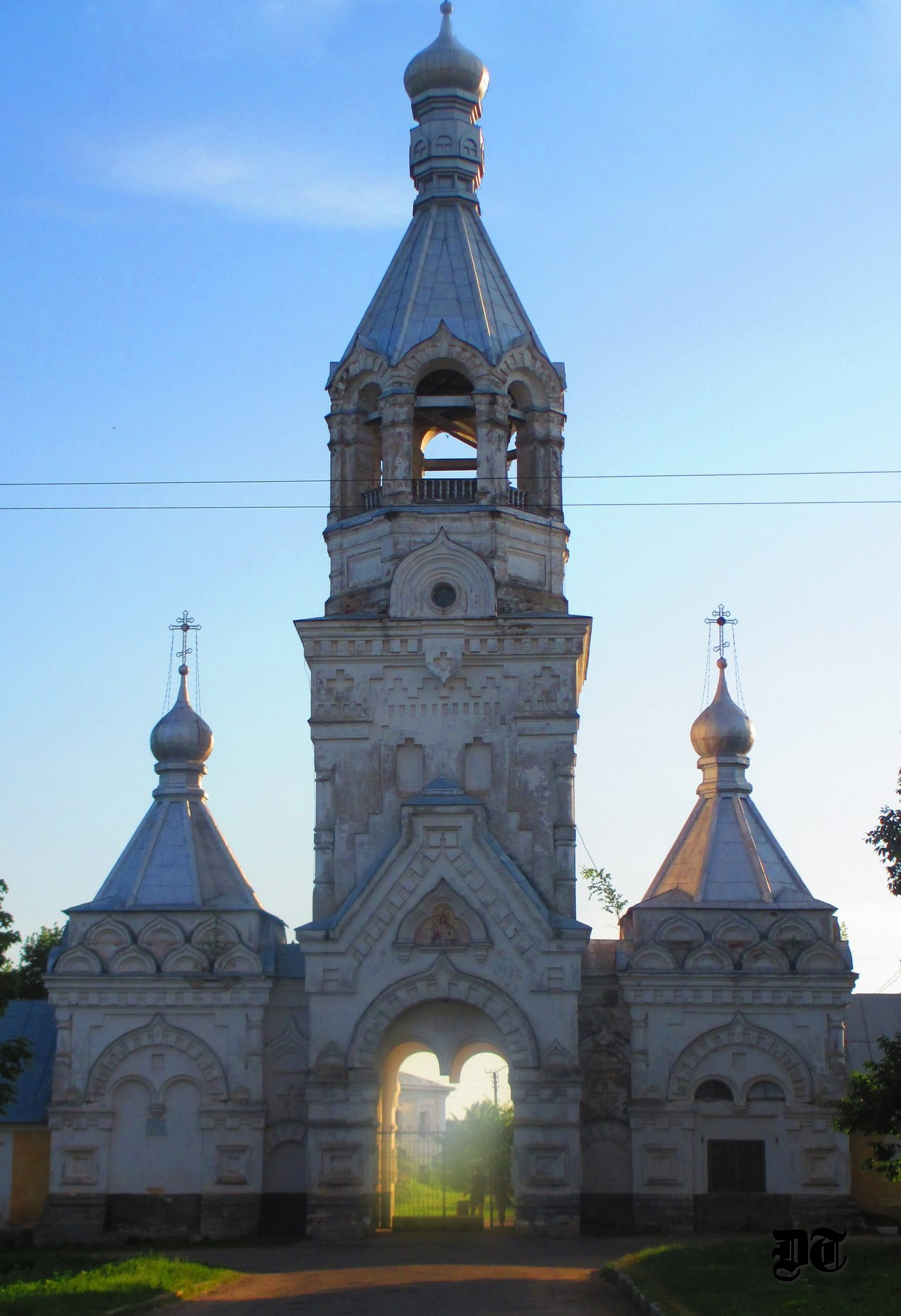
The bell tower

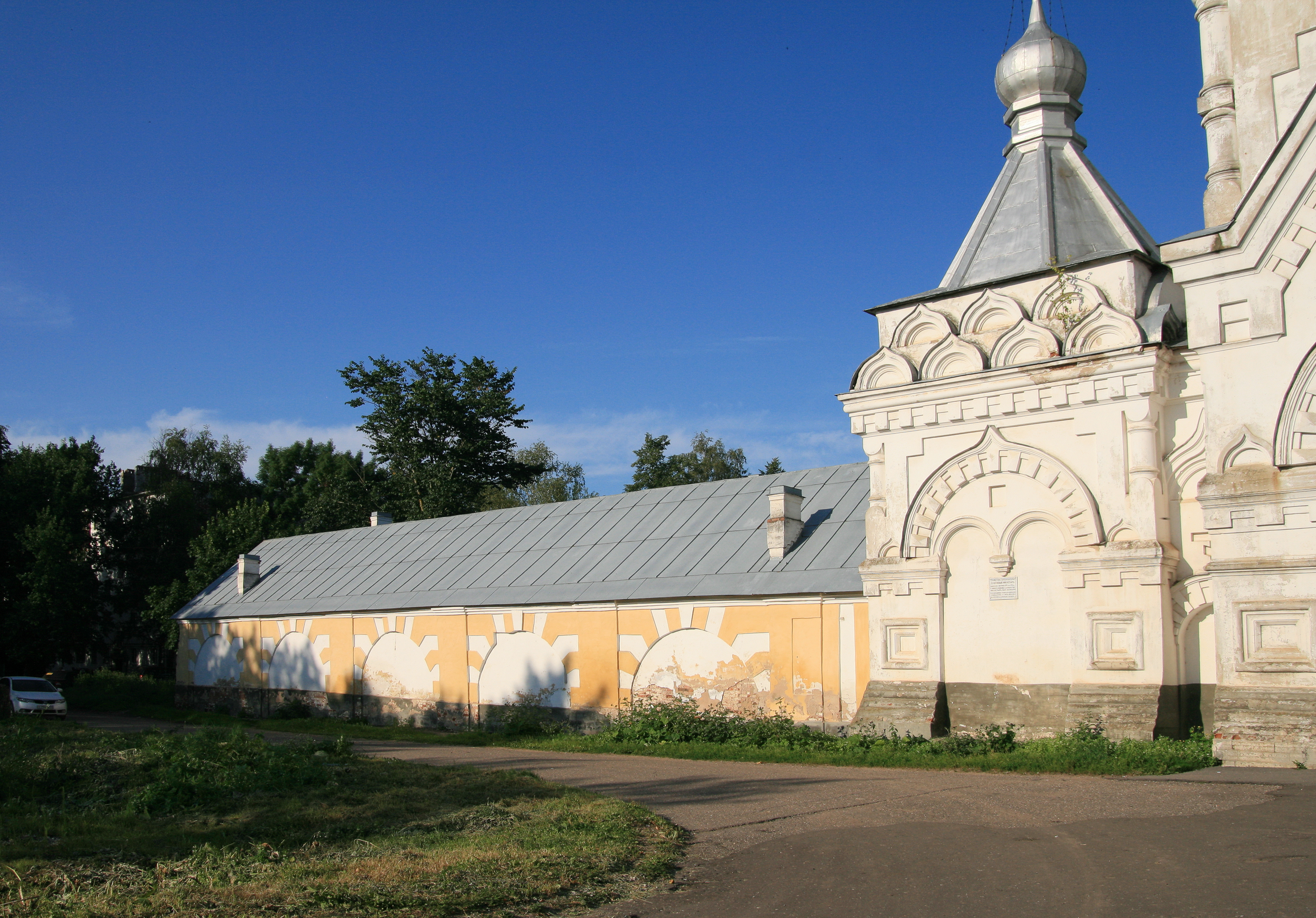
The east wall with cells inside, the southern wing

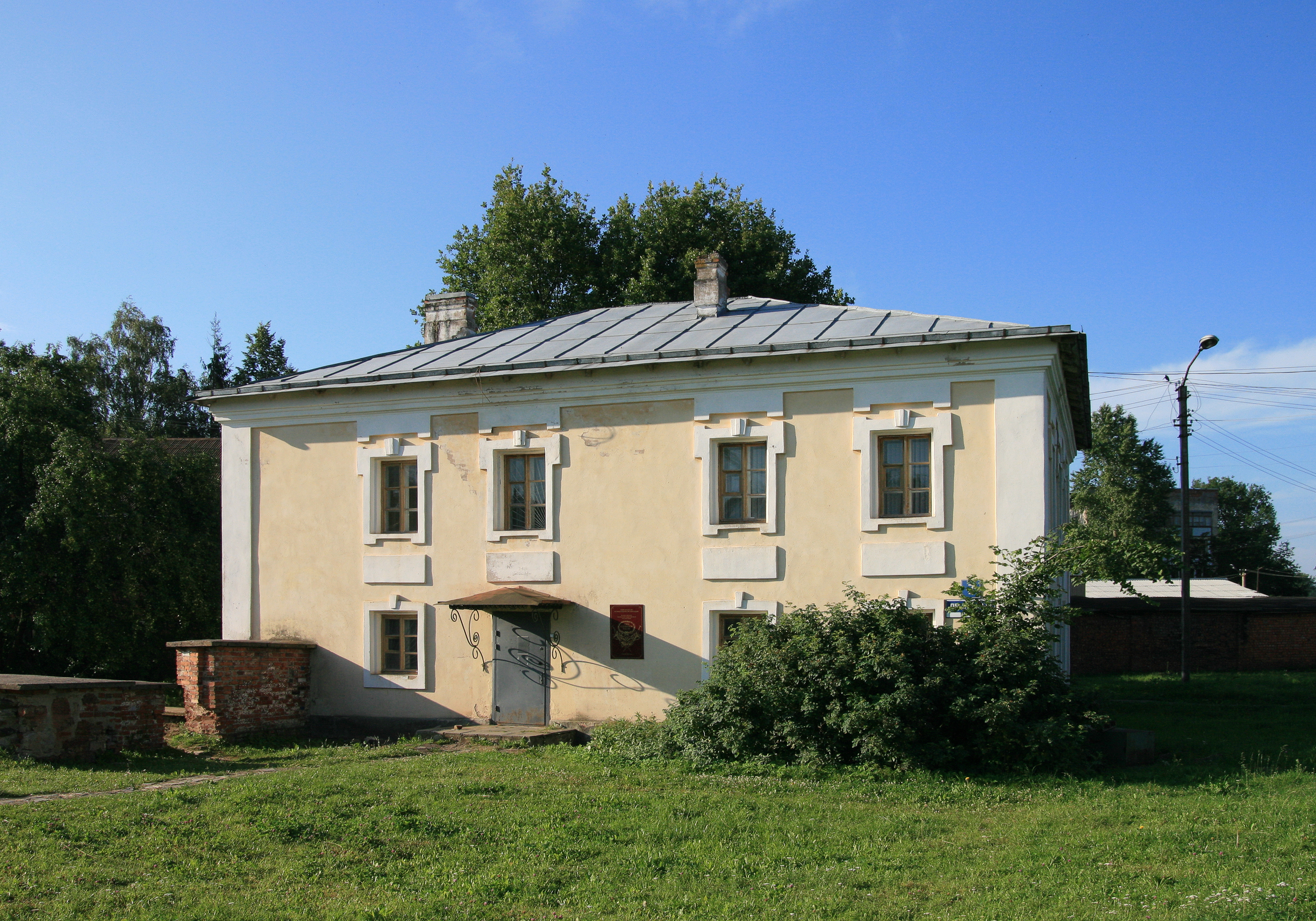
The abbess chamber

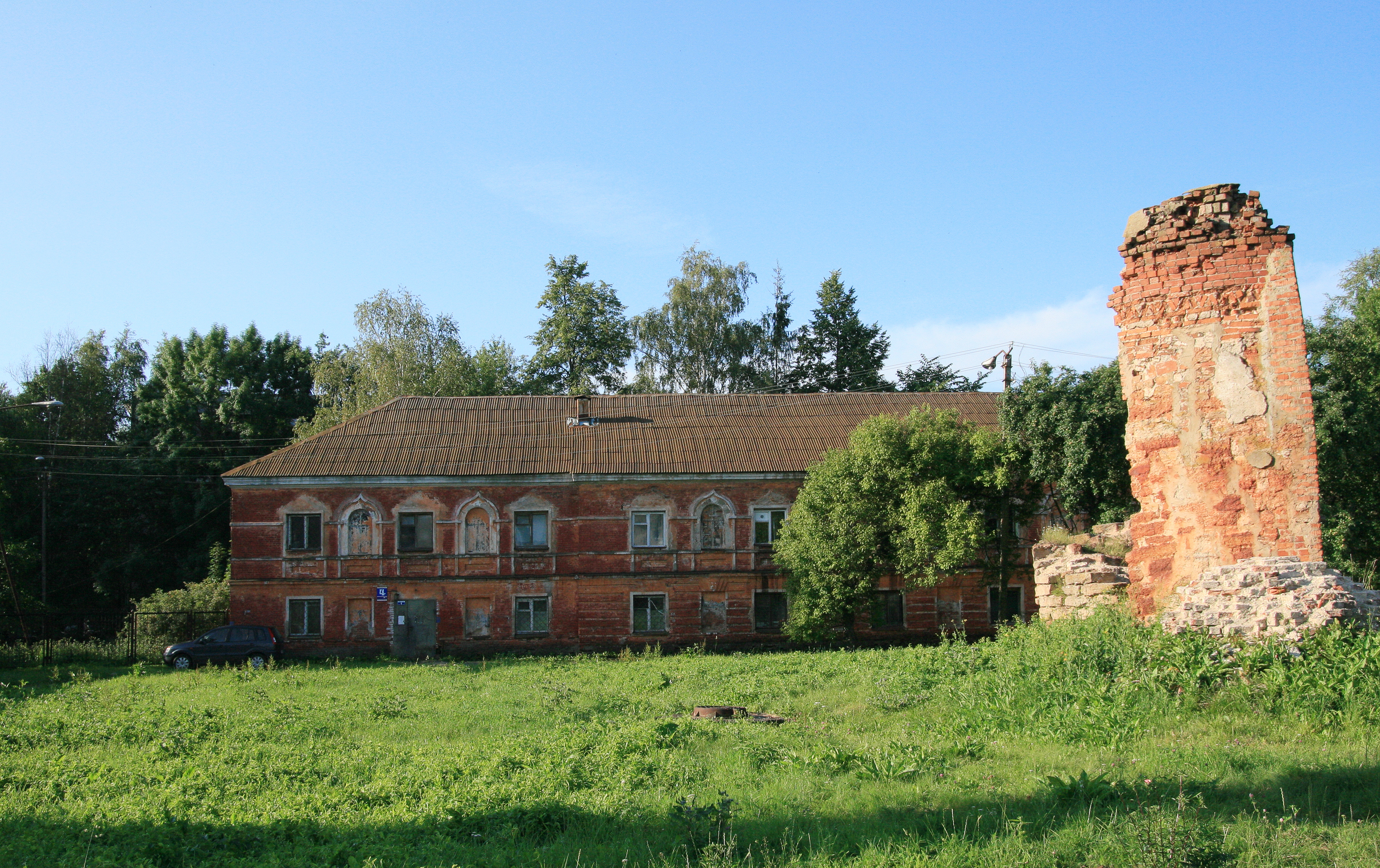
The southern cells house

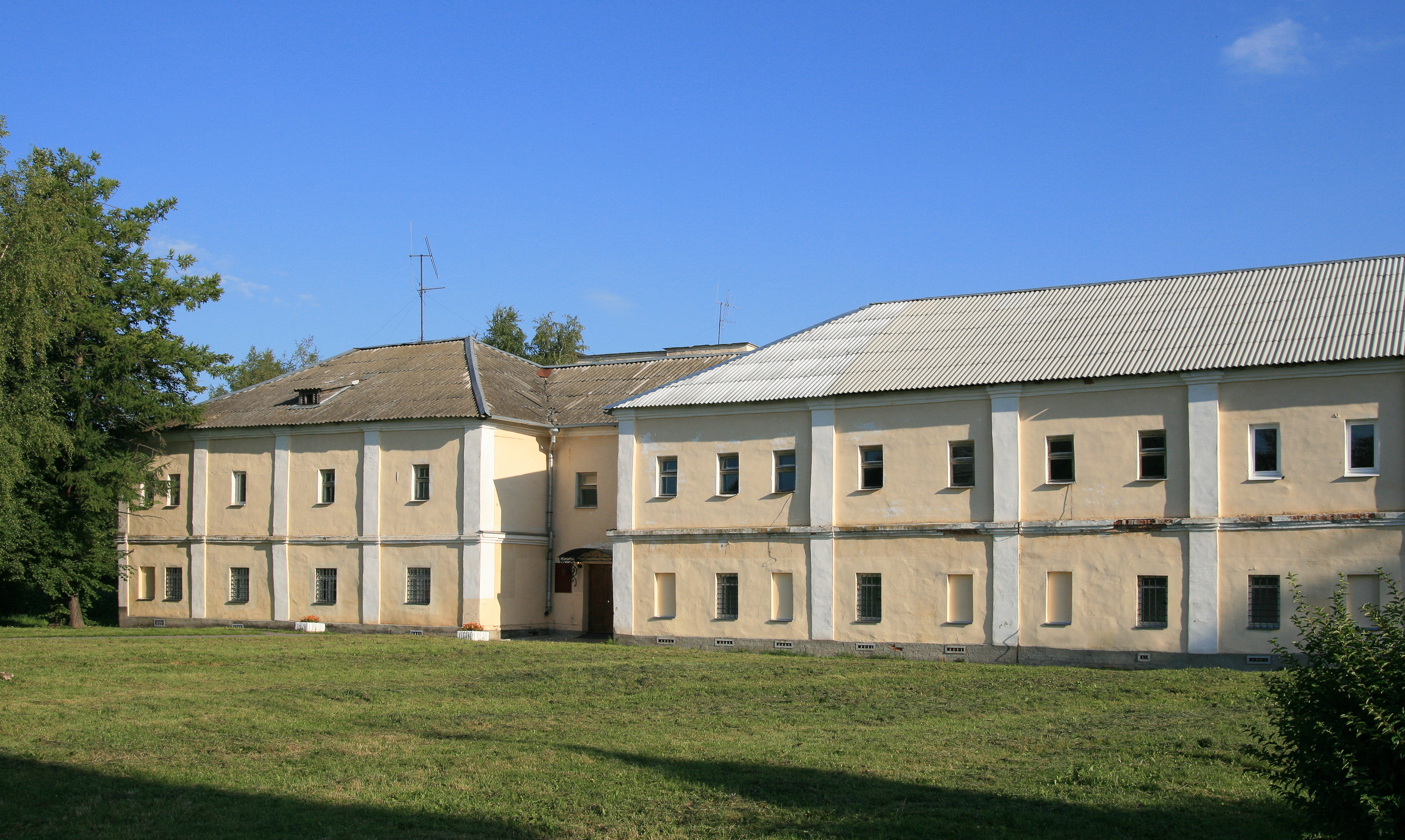
The northern cells house

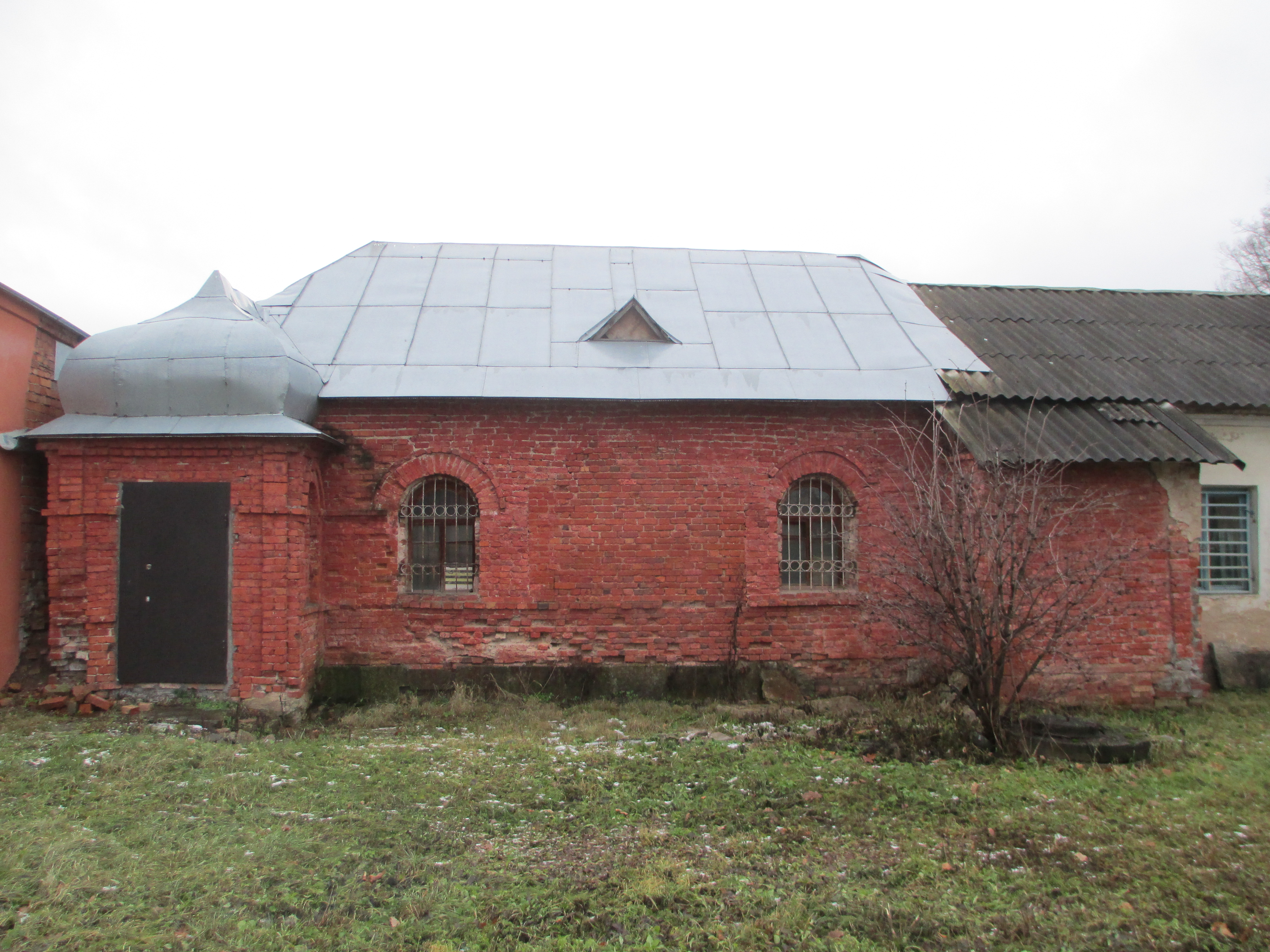
The western wall with functional rooms (the northern part) from the inner side

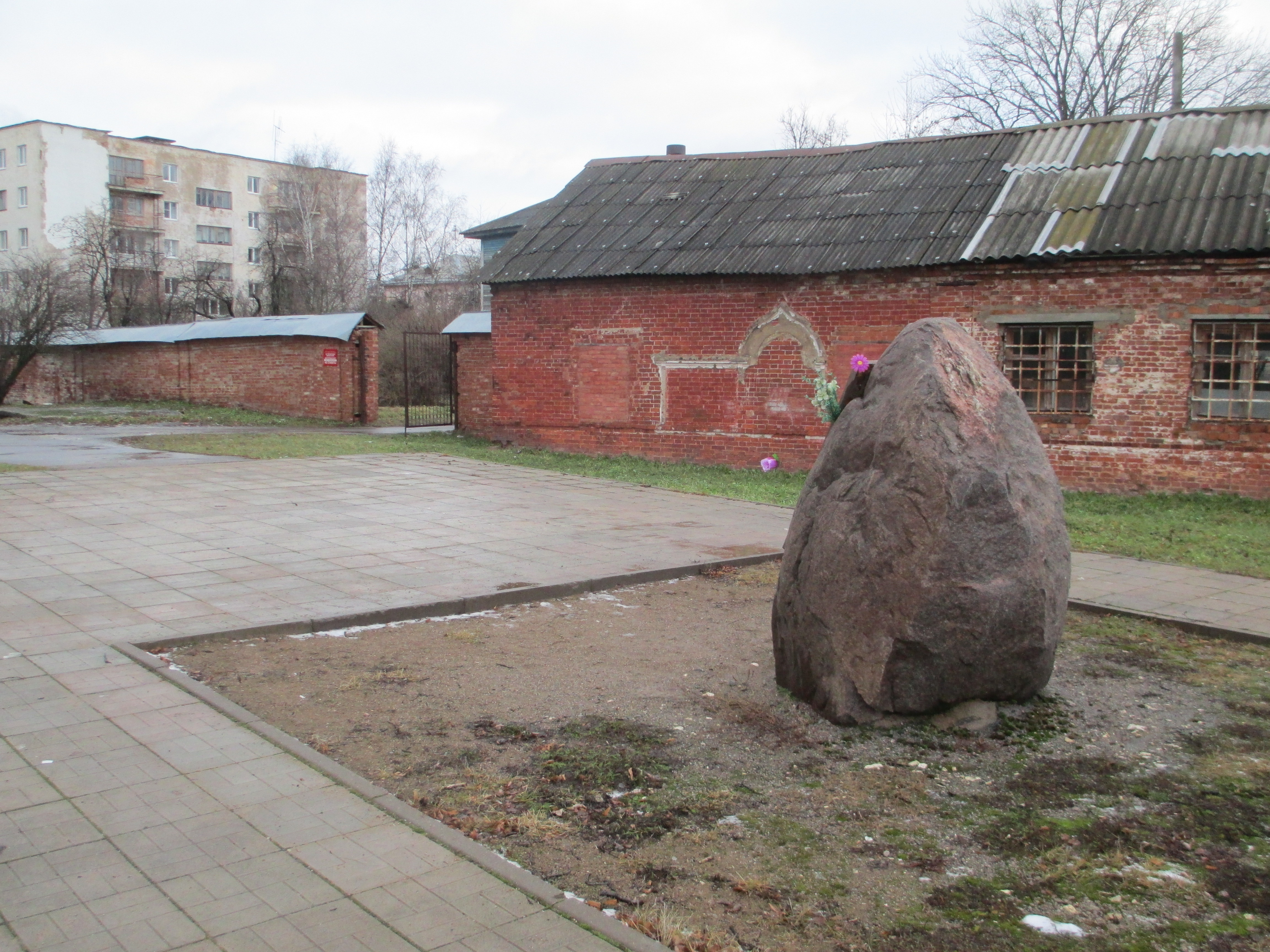
The memorial stone on the place of the former monastery cemetery

The bell tower in Russian Revival style is now the most notable building in the modern monastery complex; it also serves as a portal into the monastery. The bell tower was erected in 1903, in line with the last abbess' Lyudmila intention to replace an existing old, shabby bell tower with a new one. The construction, to a design by Theodor Vorontsov, a city architect, was entirely funded from donations. The main bell was cast at the expense of the duchess Anna Orlova-Сhesmenskaya. There is a suggestion that about 18 bells were to be hanged there in 1922.

During the World War II, the bell tower was harmed substantially – it lost its roof with the main dome. Afterwards, in the postwar period the local government was planning to bulldoze the bell tower. Nevertheless, a positive decision was taken, and the tower was the first building in the monastery subjected to the reconstruction in 1975 – 1976 based on old photographs and postcards. Now it is occupied with workshops for artists and designers. The bell tower not only dominates the monastery only but in a substantial part of the town.

The east wall with cells inside is joined to the bell tower, although they are much older. They date from 1814 – 1820 in the classicism syle according to plans by the city architect Ivan Dmitrov to replace a fence of wood. The decision to build walls of brick in the 19th century has some quite curious background. In the 19th century Novgorod became a provincial city with the monastery on the outskirts. It was usual to observe some cattle crazing near the holy place, or drunken workers singing songs while the sisters were in prayer. Abbess Lyudmila applied to the city hall regarding any walls of brick to be constructed around the monastery in order to, as she formulated it, literally, “different blasphemies not to occur almost near the holy gates”, but the application was rejected as it was assessed as "contradicting to the highly signed [architectural] plan of Novgorod". Nevertheless, the positive decision was finally taken, and the process of construction was started in 1814. The construction was funded entirely by Yelizaveta Poltoratskaya, a wealthy parishioner, the wife of a state councillor.

The east wall with cells was built in a complex with another bell tower consequently replaced with the present one. That bell tower was built in 1811 – 1813 in style of classicism: quite modest and not as tall as the present one. In its turn, that bell tower replaced with itself a wooden one, constructed in 1778. The bell tower of wood was in fact extremely non-durable, as it rotted during 14 years.

A bell tower, no matter when it was built, is meant to divide the east wall at its centre into 2 wings: the southern wing, and the northern wing. On the monastery perimeter's corners either wing is meant to be finished with small towers having spires with wind vanes, but at the present day the southern tower is not preserved. Either wing is also provided inside with cells of the average dimensions about 9 m × 8 m: there are 6 cells in the north wing, and 4 wings in the south wings (there were formerly 5).

During the World War II the ending of the southern wing with a corner tower was ruined. The reconstruction, undertaken during the postwar time, implied the full reconstruction of the building, but didn't in fact imply the reconstruction of the lost corner tower. Right after the war it was temporarily accommodated for living. In 1977 – 1982 some reconstruction works aimed to arrange workshops for artists in the cells were undertaken: by means of constructing mezzanines and changing the shape of the roof from the inner facade, the cells were turned into 2-floored with windows on the second floor. The southern corner tower finishing the wall from the south is still not reconstructed because of financial difficulties. Now there are workshops for artists there.

The abbess chamber is the oldest building in the modern monastery (but still, the ruins of the church of the Nativity dated by 1397 are retained right beneath the chamber). Built in the 1840s, it was performed in classicism style. After the northern part of the original building was damaged seriously during the World War II, the ruins were disassembled for bricks in the 1950s. The reconstruction undertaken in 1978 – 1983 was oriented on the south part only. Now it is occupied with the board of the Union of Artists.

The cells houses in the modern monastery's complex are represented with 3 building: 2 of them are made of brick (called by us conditionally "the southern house" and "the northern house"), and the rest one is of wood. The southern house is now a long red building behind the church's ruins. It is erected in 1845 in the style of eclecticism. The architect is unknown, but it looks quite the same with the cells house in Peryn (one another ancient monastery in Novgorod) built at the same years with the southern house by the city architect I. Sokolov. There are workshops for artists there now.

The northern house is now long yellow 2-floored building, standing on the opposite side of the monastery from the southern house. Historically, these were 2 separate buildings, although: the first one was built in 1884, the second one – in 1895; both buildings had a first floor of bricks, and second floor of wood. Nevertheless, they were gathered into a sole building during the reconstruction in 1981, and the second floor was replaced with one of brick in the same year. One more building with cells is made of wood, constructed in the early 20th century, and stands opposite the northern side of the perimeter. The joint building is now a museum, and the building of wood is closed to visitors. The place called Black Court was located right behind the northern house: it gathered the buildings like a stable, a bathhouse, a laundry, some shades for firewoods and hay, and a garden. This territory is out of monastery's complex, and these outbuildings are not preserved.

The west wall with functional rooms inside is a 1-floored building in the eclecticism style which borders the monastery's territory from west, serving as some kind of fence, along with its direct functions of a kitchen, a refectory, a bakery and a brewery. It was built in the 19th century in 2 stages: the refectory jointed with kitchen was erected in 1852, and then in 1879 it was added with rooms for a brewery and a bakery. In 1864 it was provided with some device of many pipes with hot water inside to dry vegetables issued in harvests (some analogue of modern underfloor heating). In 1902 the building was provided with plumbing - quite rare for provincial Novgorod of the period.

The cemetery was opened in 1868 behind the west wall, in between the monastery walls and the rampart. Originally it was meant to be for sisters only, but later on it was allowed for others to be buried there in exchange for a donation. An arc of brick called literally as the Holy Gates was constructed to lead one from the monastery to the cemetery. The cemetery was closed by the order of Novgorod City Council within the anti-religious campaign on March 5, 1924, along with other 3 cemeteries in Novgorod located within city area. Some locally familiar people were buried there, among them:

- Irina Butakova, the composer Sergey Rakhmaninov's grandmother, a frequent visitor;
- Jacob (russified Yakov) McDonald, an entrepreneur who operated there and engaged in charity in Novgorod.

The Church of All Hollows was the second church in the monastery complex erected at the cemetery in 1869–1871. It was the only building in the monastery in use for congregation after the monastery was officially closed in 1918. All the holy items from the former monastery were moved into the church's vaults. The Novgorod city soviet (a new analogue for city hall) sentenced on August 15, 1928, the church along with some other late churches there to be disassembled for bricks to build a new power plant. The same call about the church was in the article published in Zvezda magazine in 1929. As the result, the church was disassembled in 1929, and the cemetery was destroyed.

== Interesting inhabitants and facts ==
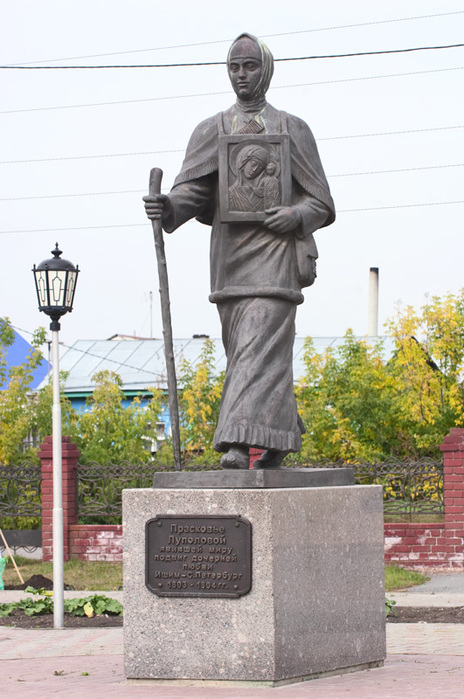
Praskovia Louppolova in bronze in Ishim town, the place of the exile

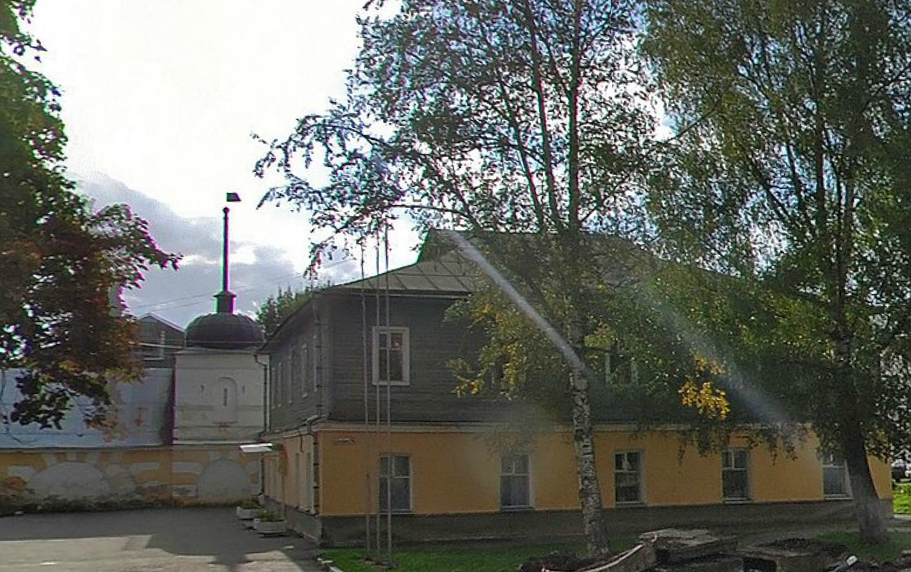
The monastery hotel. Maria the pythia lived there on the 2nd floor

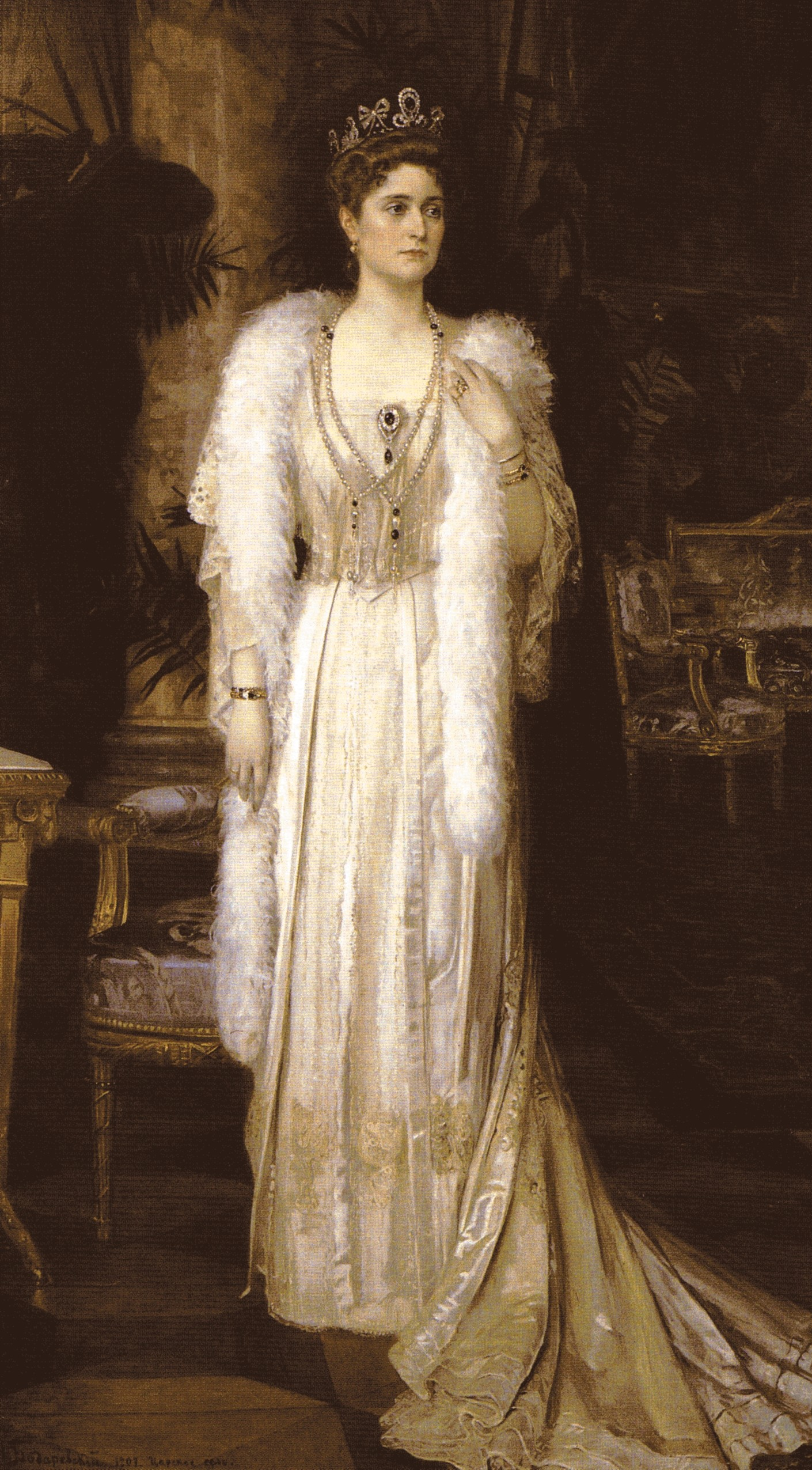
Empress Alexandra, who in 1916 got a negative prediction from Maria the pythia in the monastery

=== Praskovia Louppolova ===
A bright blur in the monastery's history is about some story caused a broad public outcry in Russian society in the 19th century. The characters are Alexander I of Russia and a poor Russian girl. It took about a year for Praskovia Louppolova, the daughter of an exiled officer, to get to the capital by foot from a town in Siberia. She hoped to plead to the emperor in person as her last chance to bring her family back from the exile in Siberia. The emperor forgave her father after he had known about her feat in the name of love to her family, and even assigned them an allowance. Afterwards, she decided to become a nun, and moved to the Desyatinny monastery. She settled in the monastery as a novice, but did not manage to be tonsured as she died at age 20 on December 4, 1809, and was buried there.

Praskovia's story became a popular plot for creativity after it had been described in several Russian magazines. It was reflected in a sequence of works by Russian literatures. In particular, Praskovia is a live prototype for Maria Mironova, the protagonist in Alexander Pushkin's novel Kapitanskaya Dochka (in the English variant - The Captain's Daughter, 1837). Nikolai Polevoy distorts Praskovia's name to make it more demotic and emphasize her poorness, and creates his play Parasha Louppolova (1840) to be acted in Alexandrinsky theatre.

It makes some wonder, that the story became well-known and popular in the West even faster than in Russia. It turned into series of music and literature works too. The first novel Élisabeth ou les Exilés de Sibérie (in the English variant – The Exiles of Siberia, 1806) about Praskovia's fate was written by Sophie Ristaud Cottin. Later on, Xavier de Maistre creates his novel La Jeune Sibérienne, (in the English variant - The Young Siberian, 1815). Then, basing on the novel by Cottin, the Italian composer Gaetano Donizetti creates the lyrical drama Otto mesi in due ore o Gli esiliati in Siberia (in the English variant - Eight months in two hours, 1827).

After the Praskovia's burial there, the monastery subsequently became a familiar place for tourism and pilgrimage. Even the empress visited the monastery on September 24, 1817. Although the particular location of her grave in the monastery is unknown, a headstone was established in the main church's vaults in the beginning of the 20th century, reportedly based on oral stories. In addition, a large portrait styled of something between an icon and a secular portrait was painted on the wall near the headstone. Nevertheless, it was rather a symbolical burial place, as Koupriyanov, the teacher in a local gymnasium, wrote about Praskovia to be buried somewhere inside the monaster's wall "by a special order of the highest executives".

=== Maria the pythia ===
One more famous inhabitant was Maria who lived there in the beginning of the 20th century. She was a 100-year-old woman who worked, prayed hard and was said to heal and make predictions. Her godson, biographer and follower Loukilian Trofimov, claimed that she was inchurched since her early years; when once she was revealed exhausted in Tihvin forest by locals with chains on her body, she had spent her 30 years there in wandering. He also asserts her to be of noble origins, and that her sister Anna is buried in Saint Petersburg at the Smolensky Cemetery. She spent her last 16 years in the monastery.

She was famous due to many things inherent to her personality including her lifestyle and that she was reportedly able to heal and make predictions. Written and oral testimony of this were recorded. A notable one is about the singer Anastasia Vyaltseva who was ill, and one of her chorists who came to ask Maria about Vyaltseva's health. Maria pointed at the sky and said: "Behold, Vyaltseva will sing there soon". In fact, Anastasia Vyaltseva died in 3 days after.

One another story was about a rich trader who became a bankrupt. He considered suicide, but was convinced to visit Maria before. When he just came into the monastery without having time to introduce himself, she saw him and told: “So get a bullet in [your] head once – you’ll be a good horse for the Satan”. Then they had a long conversation in her cell, and he became better-off afterwards.

The most famous of her predictions is about the empress Alexandra who visited her in 1916. The content of their conversation is reflected in Alexandra's letter to the emperor:

"She was lying on a bed in a small dark room, so we grabbed a candle with ourselves to make it possible to see each other. She is 107 years old, she wears chains [at her body]... She usually works continuously, walks about, tailors for prisoners without glasses, and never washes herself. But of course, there's no smell or any feeling of uncleanliness - she is grizzle-headed, having cute, thin, oval face with pretty, young, radiant eyes; her smile is extremely nice. She blessed and kissed us... She told me: "And you, beauty, will take a plight on yourself; don't be afraid (she repeated that several times). They will build 2 churches in Russia for you have come here now...” She told us not to worry regarding our children – they will be married [by men]; I didn't manage to hear the rest"

____________________

"Она лежала на кровати в маленькой темной комнате, и поэтому мы захватили с собой свечку, чтобы можно было видеть друг друга. Ей 107 лет, она носит вериги... Обычно она беспрестанно работает, расхаживает, шьет для каторжан и для солдат, притом без очков – и никогда не умывается. Но, разумеется, никакого дурного запаха или ощущения нечистоплотности - она седая, у нее милое, тонкое, овальное лицо с прелестными молодыми лучистыми глазами. Она поцеловала и благословила нас... Мне она сказала: «А ты, красавица, тяжелый крест (примешь), не страшись (она повторила это несколько раз). За то, что ты к нам приехала, будут в России 2 церкви строить...». Сказала, чтобы мы не беспокоились относительно детей, что они выдут замуж, остального я не расслышала» (Russian language)

-The extract from empress Alexandra's letter to her husband, December 2, 1916

According to oral witnesses, that time she also told the empress to beware of March, 1. After asking to clarify the phrase, she said that “there will be a big mess [on March 1]”. As we know, Nicholas II signed his Abdication act on March 2, 1917, and riots in Moscow and Kronstadt took place on March 1, 1917; the Baltic Fleet swore to rebels that day as well. The fact is that her negative prediction came true in 1918.

Maria died on January 29, 1917, in the age 107 in the monastery, a year before the monastery was closed, and was buried in the monastery's main church vaults, near the (symbolical) grave of Praskovia Louppolova. A cross was erected in the monastery to memorize them both.

=== Curious facts ===
Some curious facts regarding the monastery are brought below:

- a library of ancient document was kept in the monastery. The inventory act of 1617 counts 12 manuscripts on paper and 11 manuscripts on parchment as survived after the monastery's defeat during the Swedish occupation in 1611 – 1617. At the present day, among the survived documents the Triodion dated to the 15th century, and The Ladder of Divine Ascent by the version of Ivan of Sinai dated to the 15th century can be mentioned; the most part of the library was reportedly damaged in 1925;
- there's a version about some German aristocracy to have residences in the monastery during the republican period;
- the facts that in 1864 the monastery was provided with some technical device consisting of many pipes with hot water inside to dry vegetables in vaults as well as that it was one of the first buildings in the provincial Novgorod provided with a plumbing at the turn of the 19th century make it able to consider the monastery as some kind of technically progressive (or even innovative) institution (at the local scales);
- old citizen used to note that the monastery was especially clean and well-maintained in the 20th century; the main alley was notable with 3 cedars (a rare type of wood for Novgorod region).

== Gallery ==
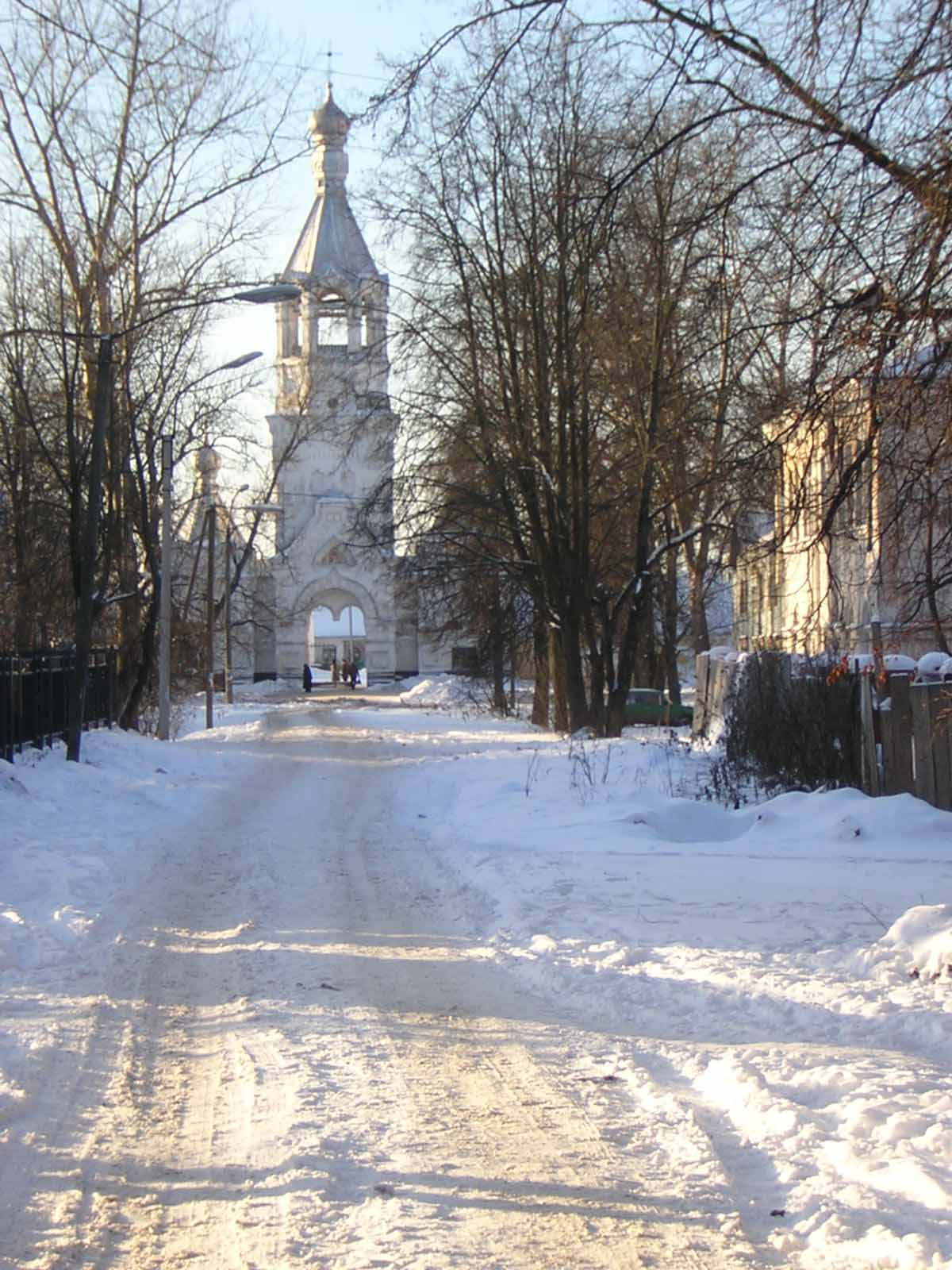
The bell tower from the side of Dobrynya street, an ancient street of medieval Novgorod

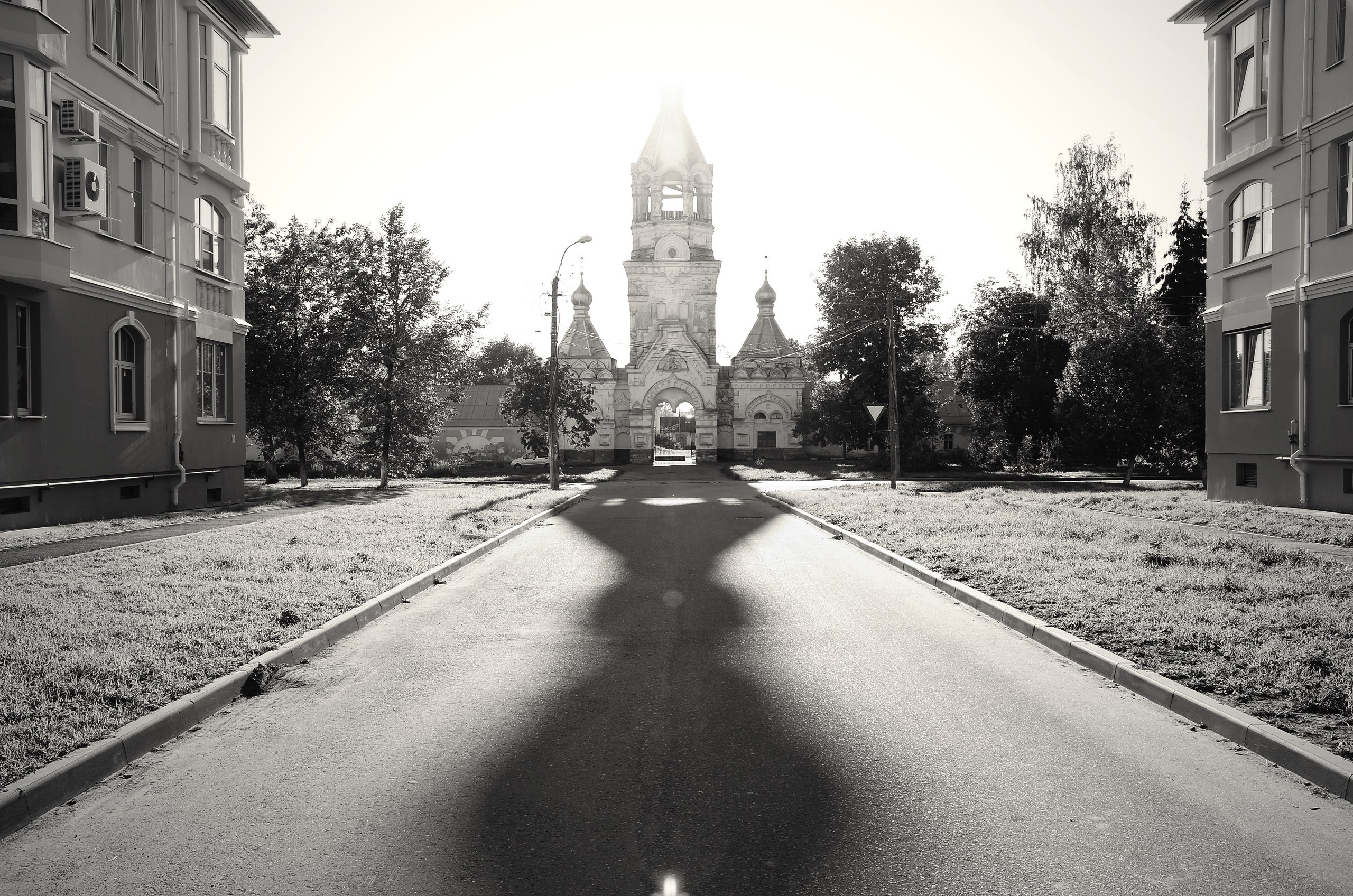
The bell tower from the side of Dobrynya street (a historical street)

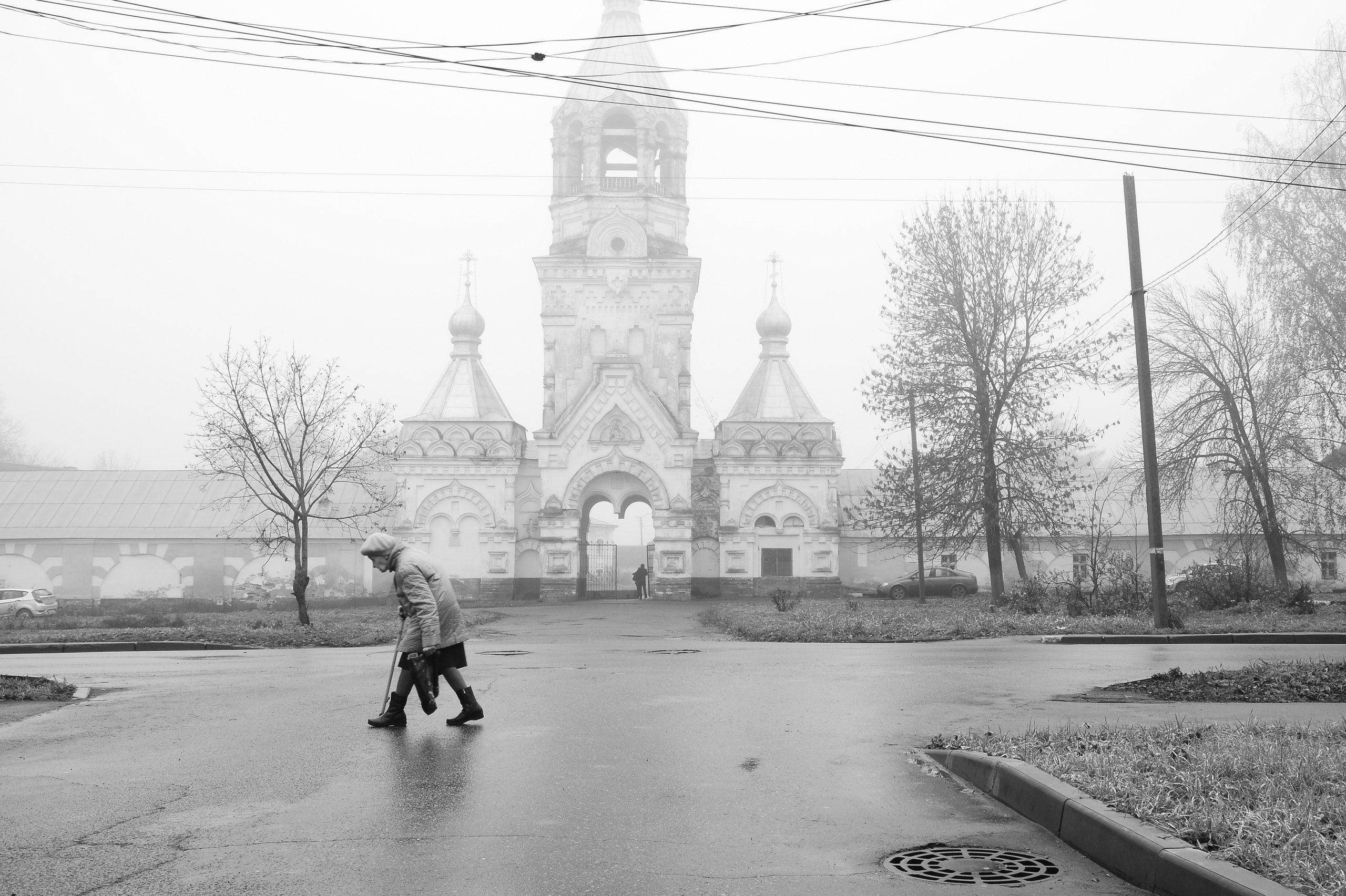
The bell tower from the side of Dobrynya street (a historical street)

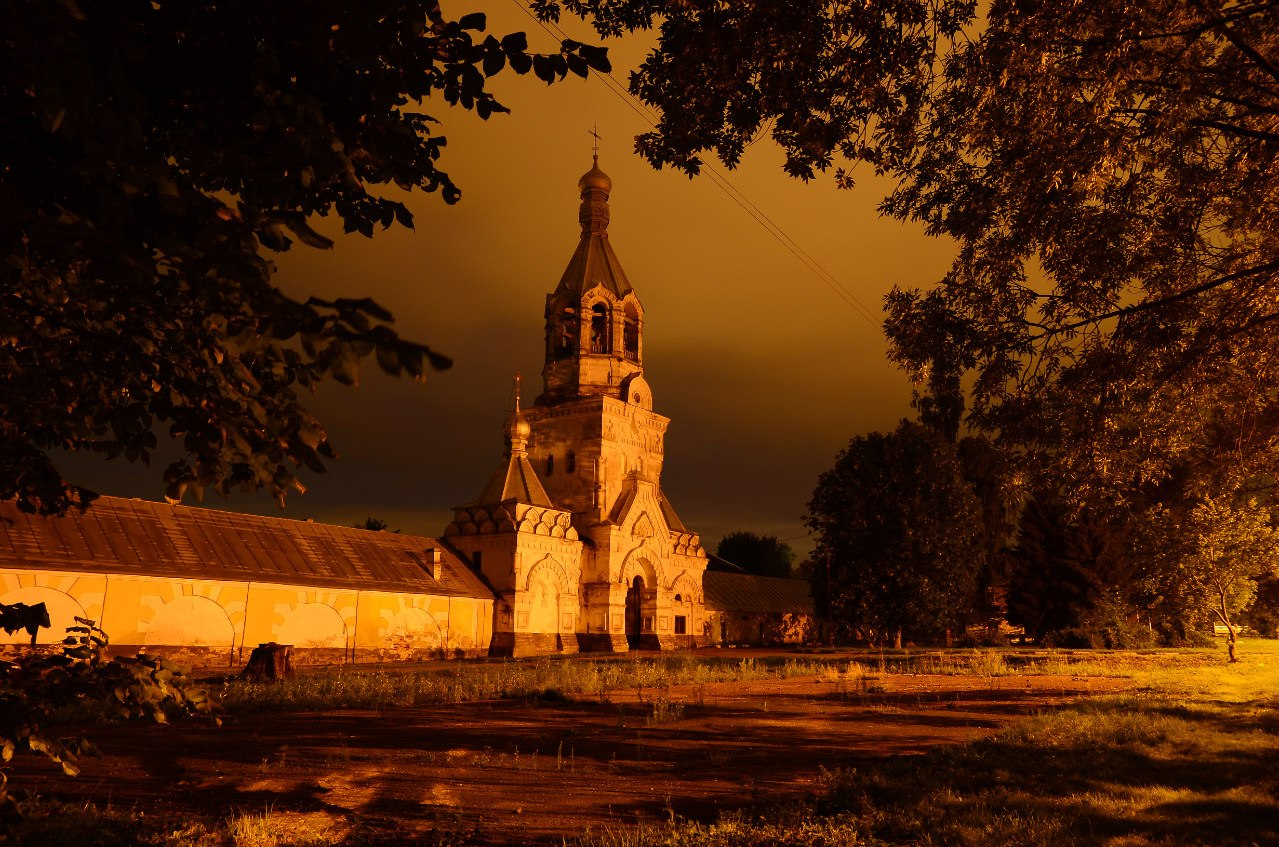
The bell tower

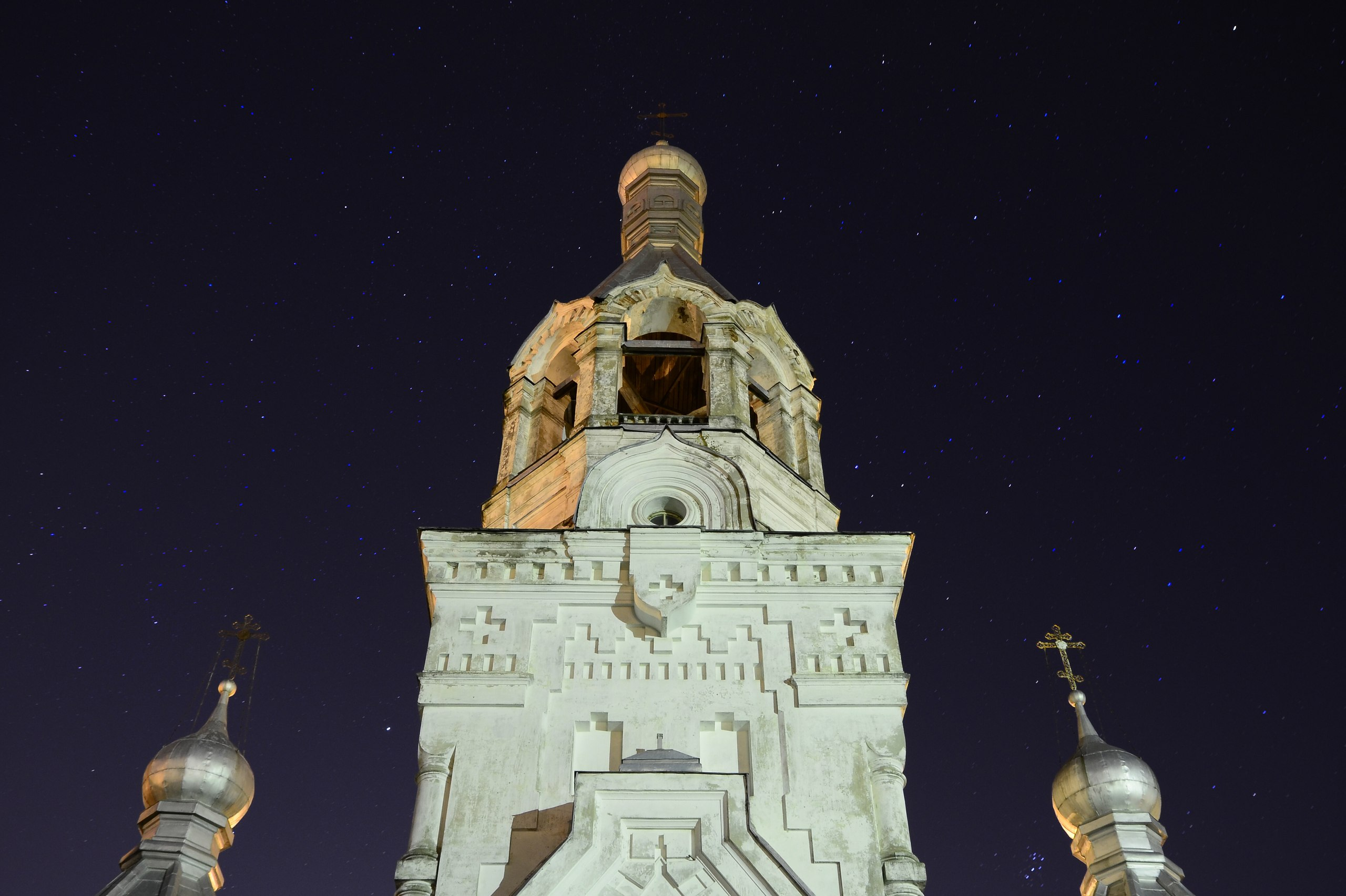
The bell tower

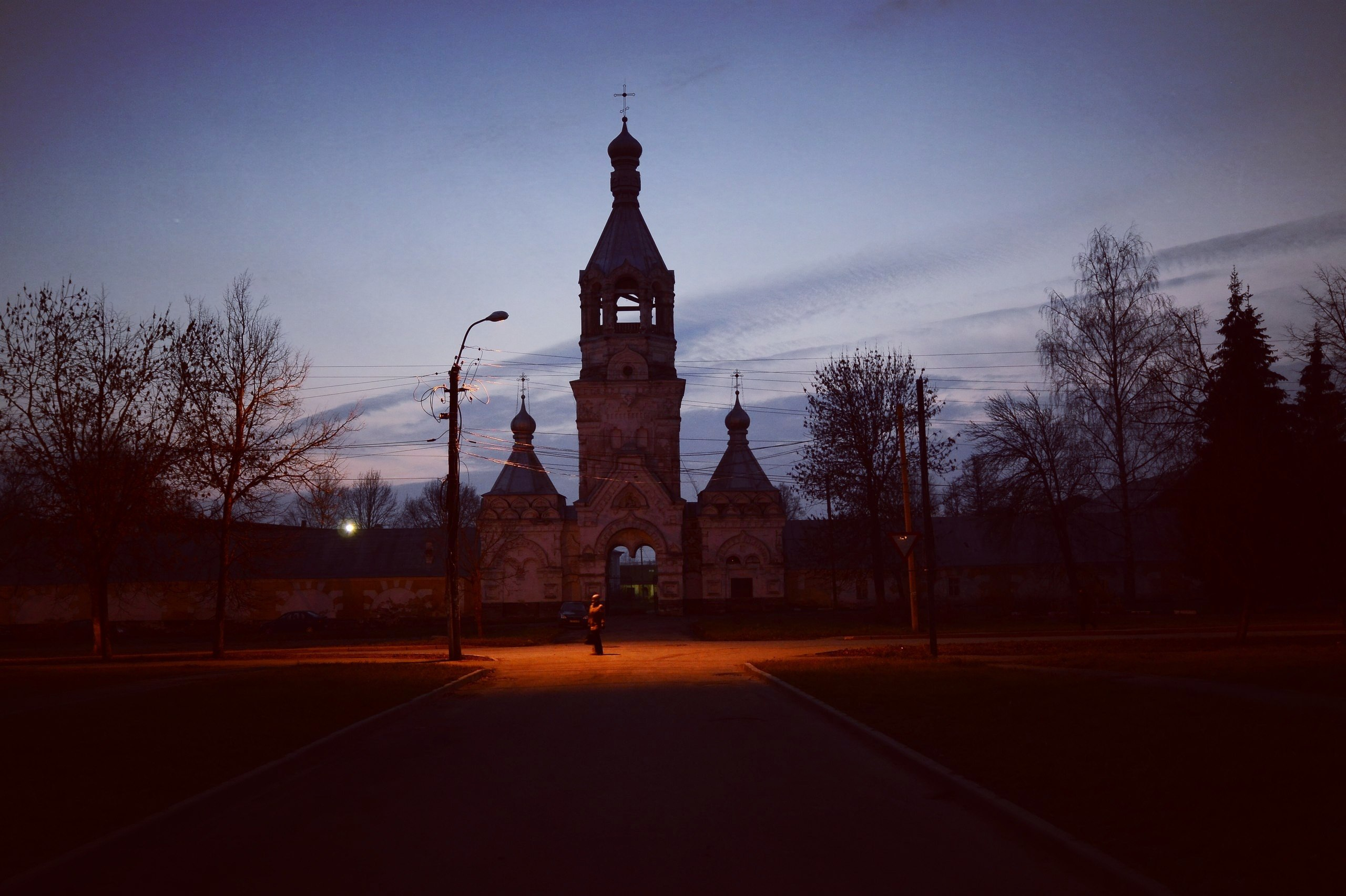
The bell tower

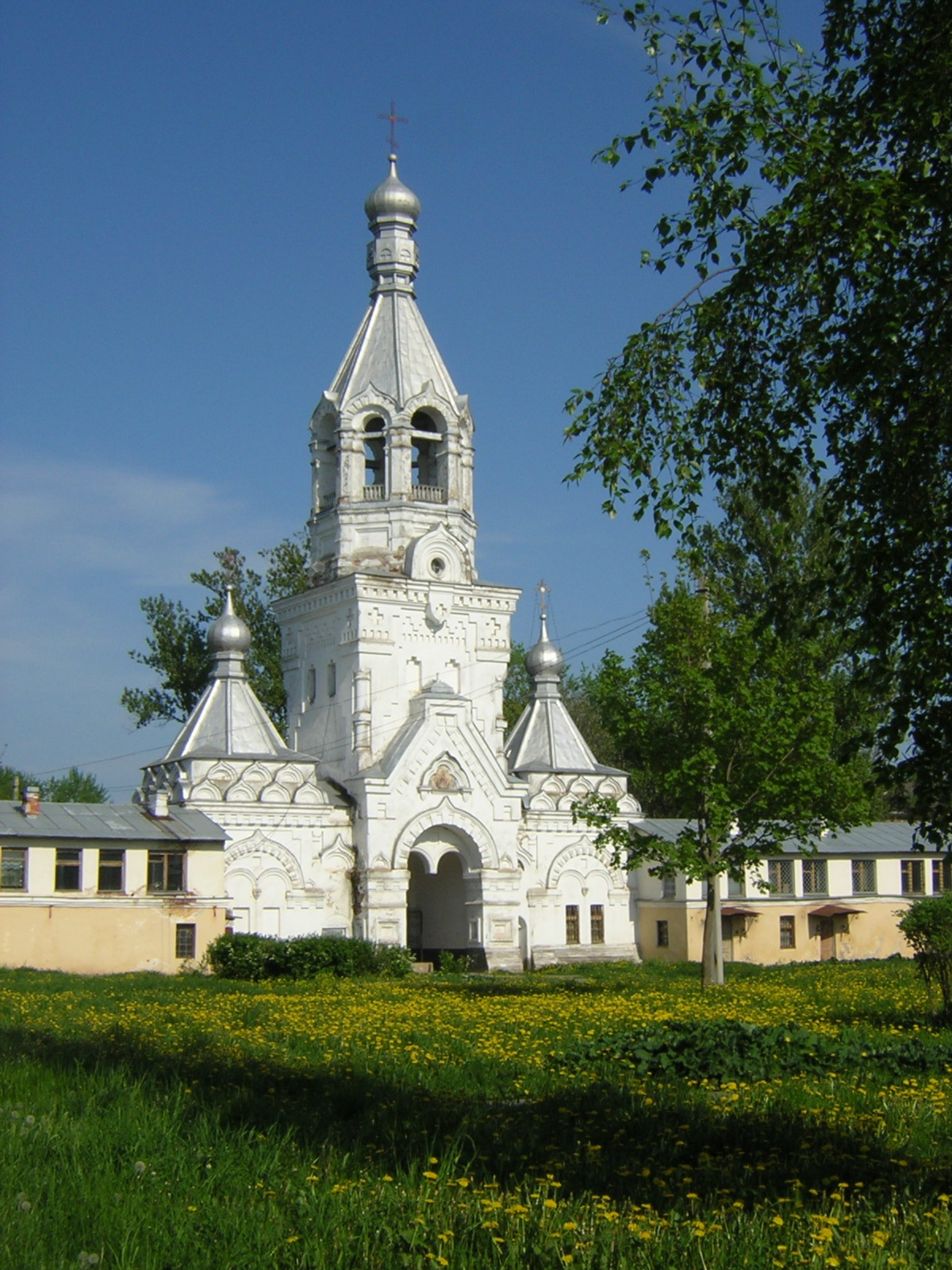
The bell tower, the inner side

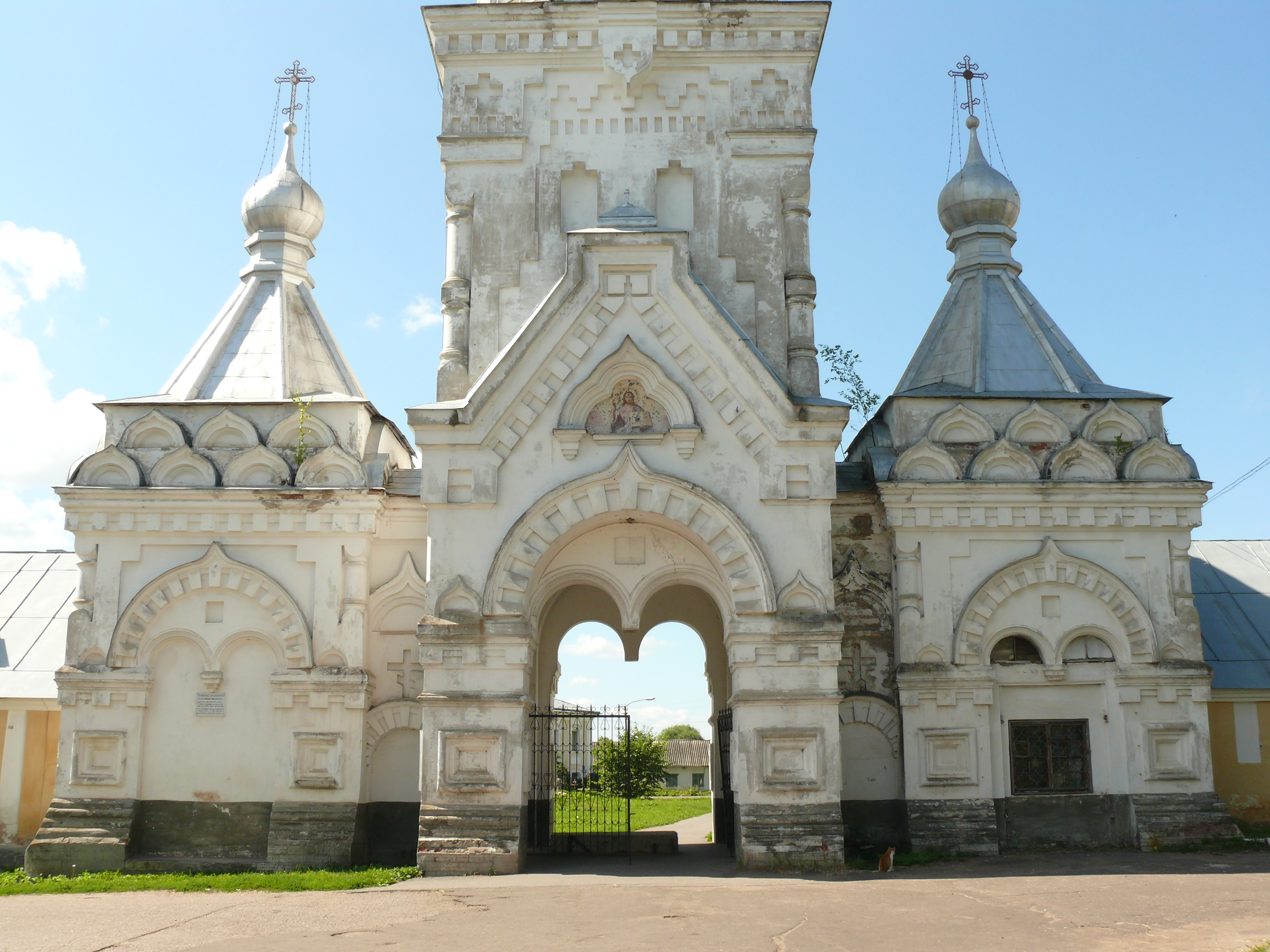
The main entrance, the outer facade

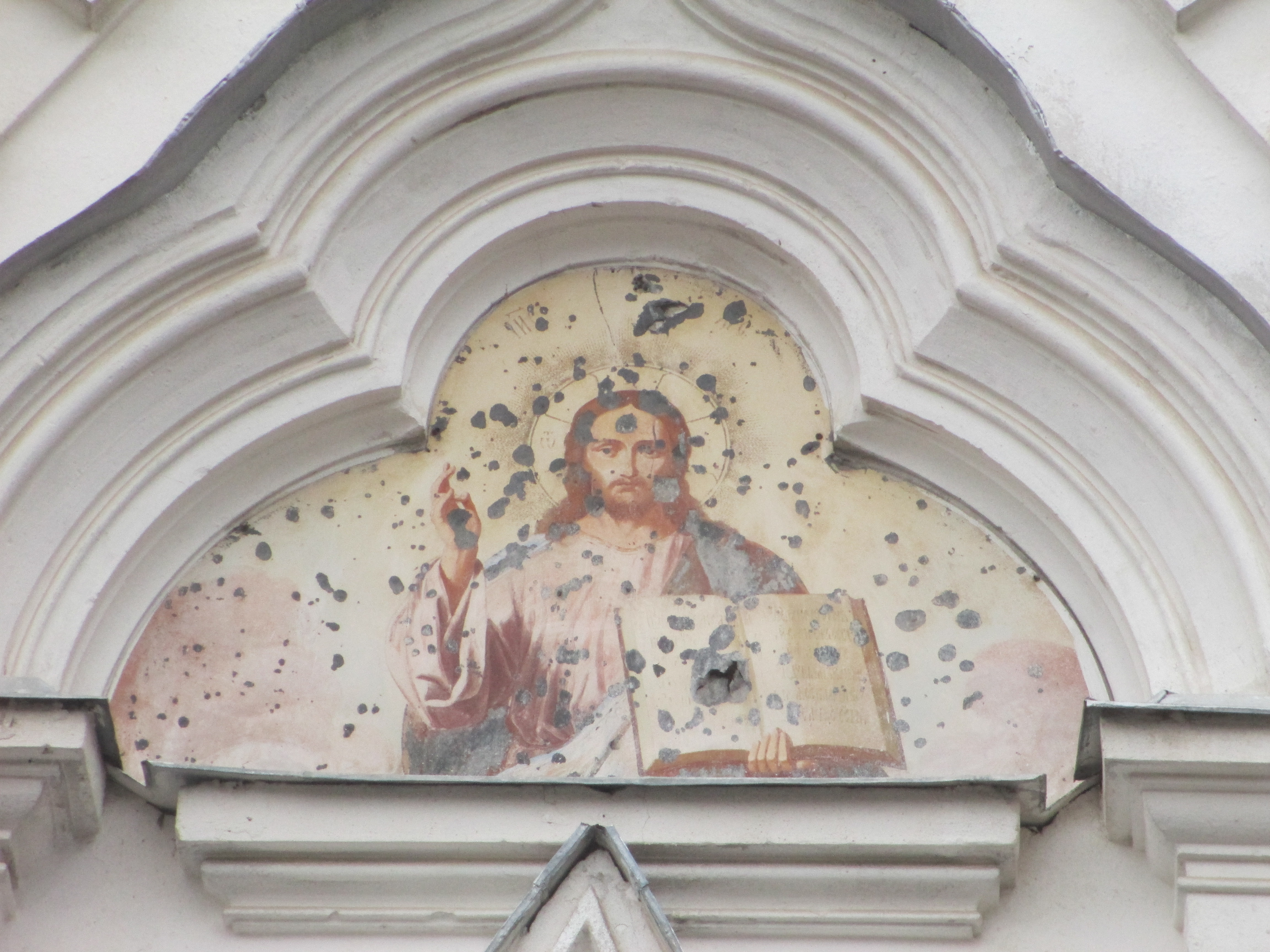
The icon of Christ Pantocrator above the monastery portal (the outer facade), early 20th century

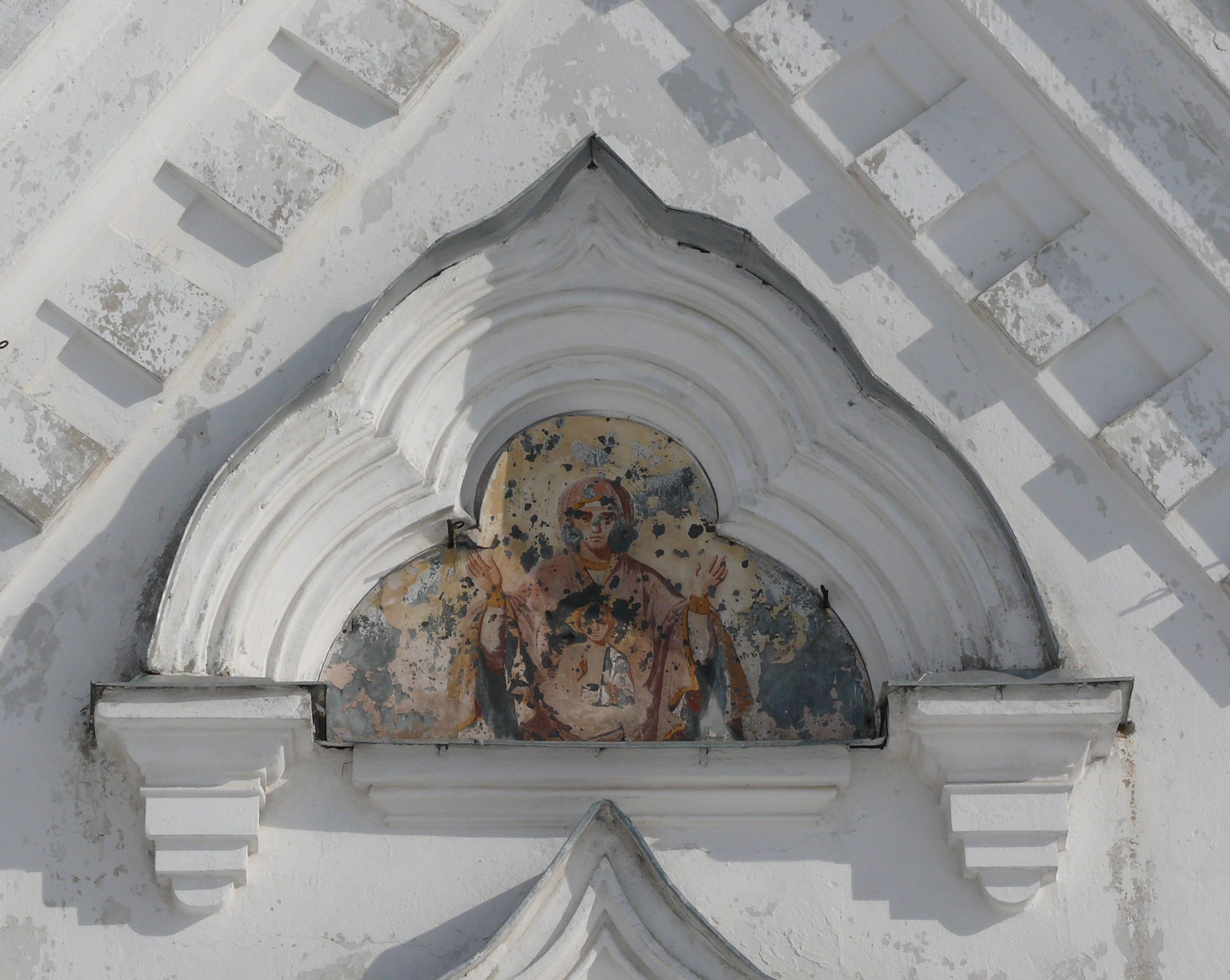
The icon of Our Lady of the Sign above the monastery portal (the inner facade), early 20th century

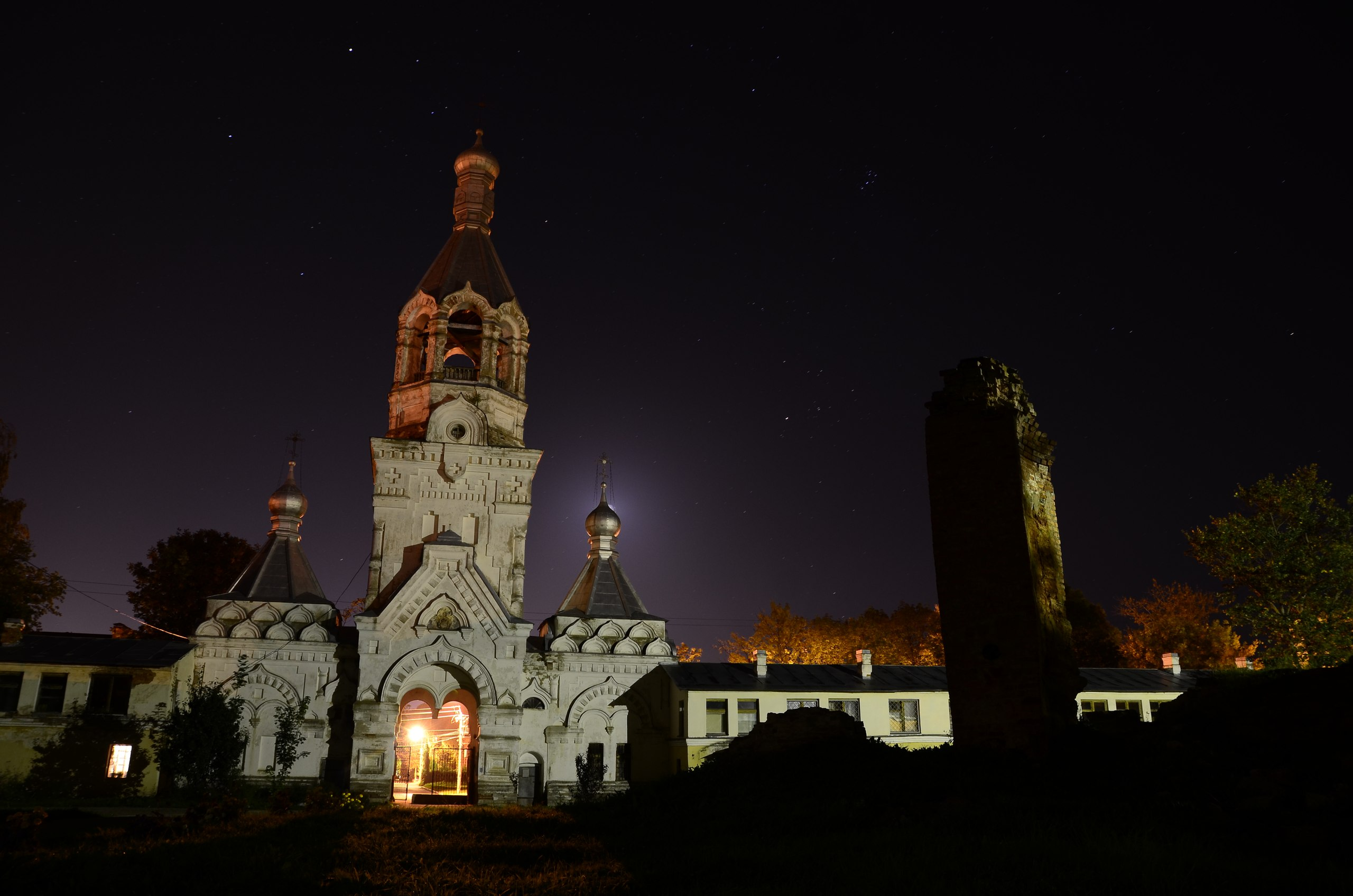
The bell tower from the inner side inside

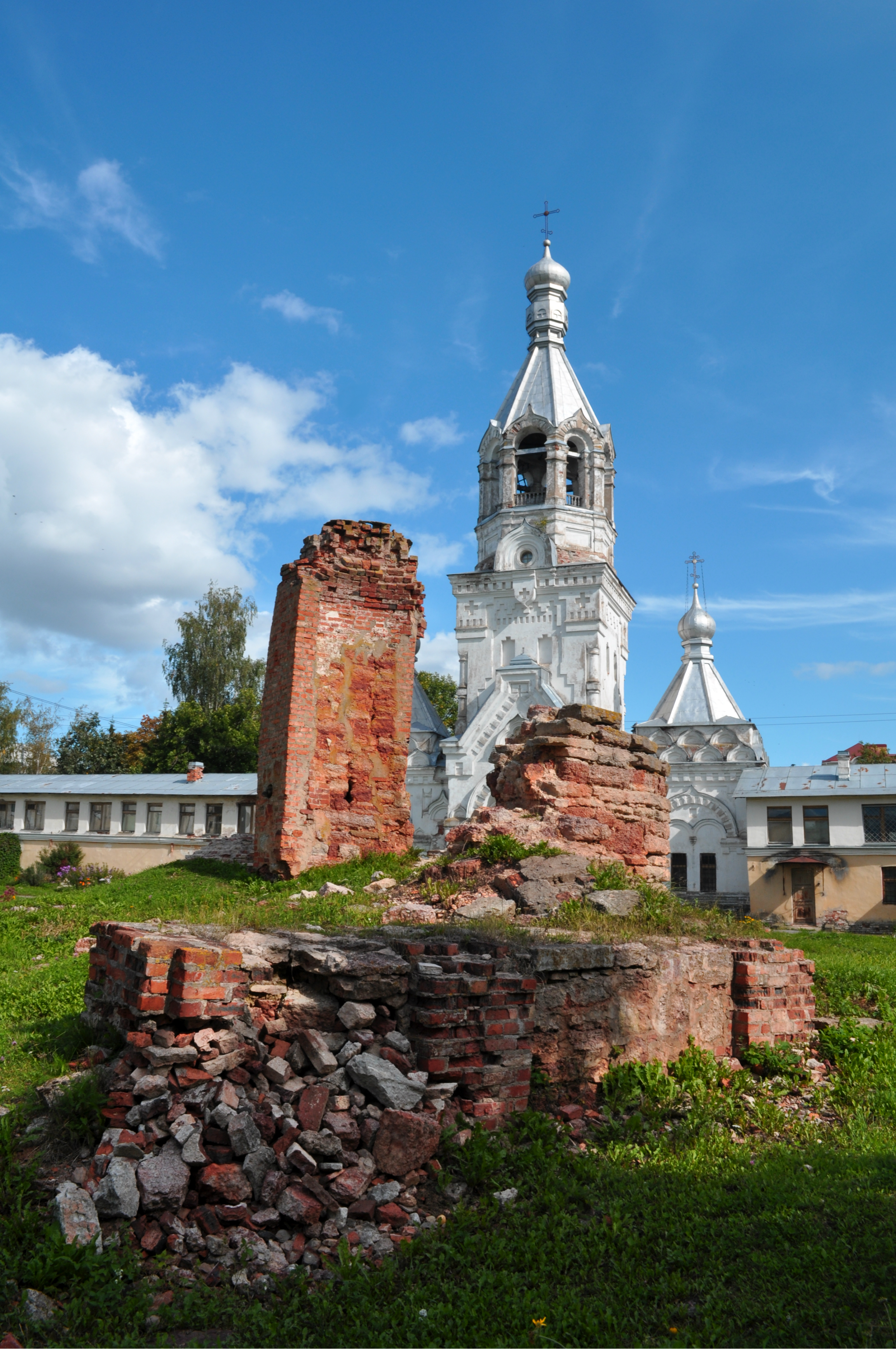
The ruins of church of the Nativity in summer

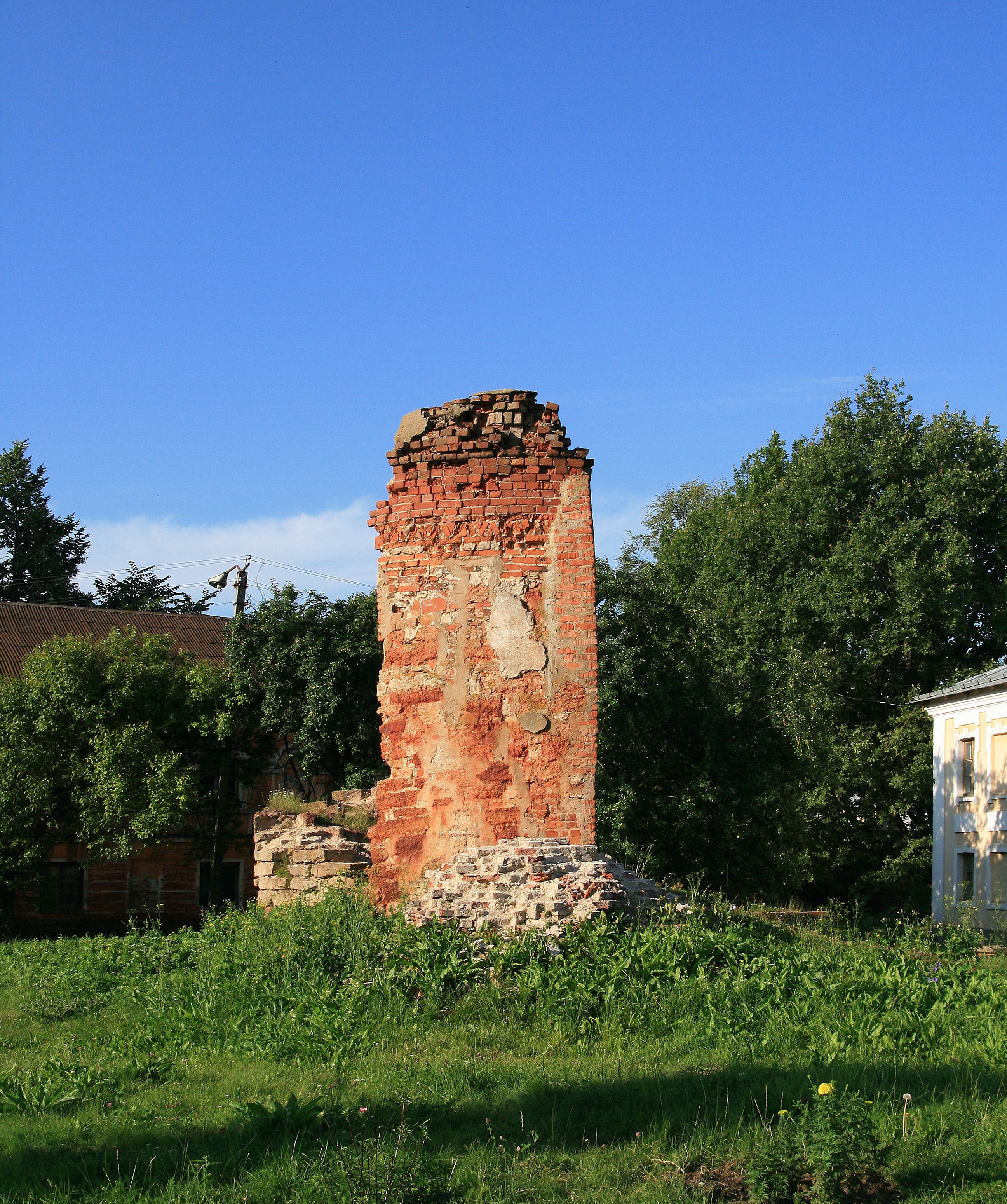
The ruins of church of the Nativity in summer

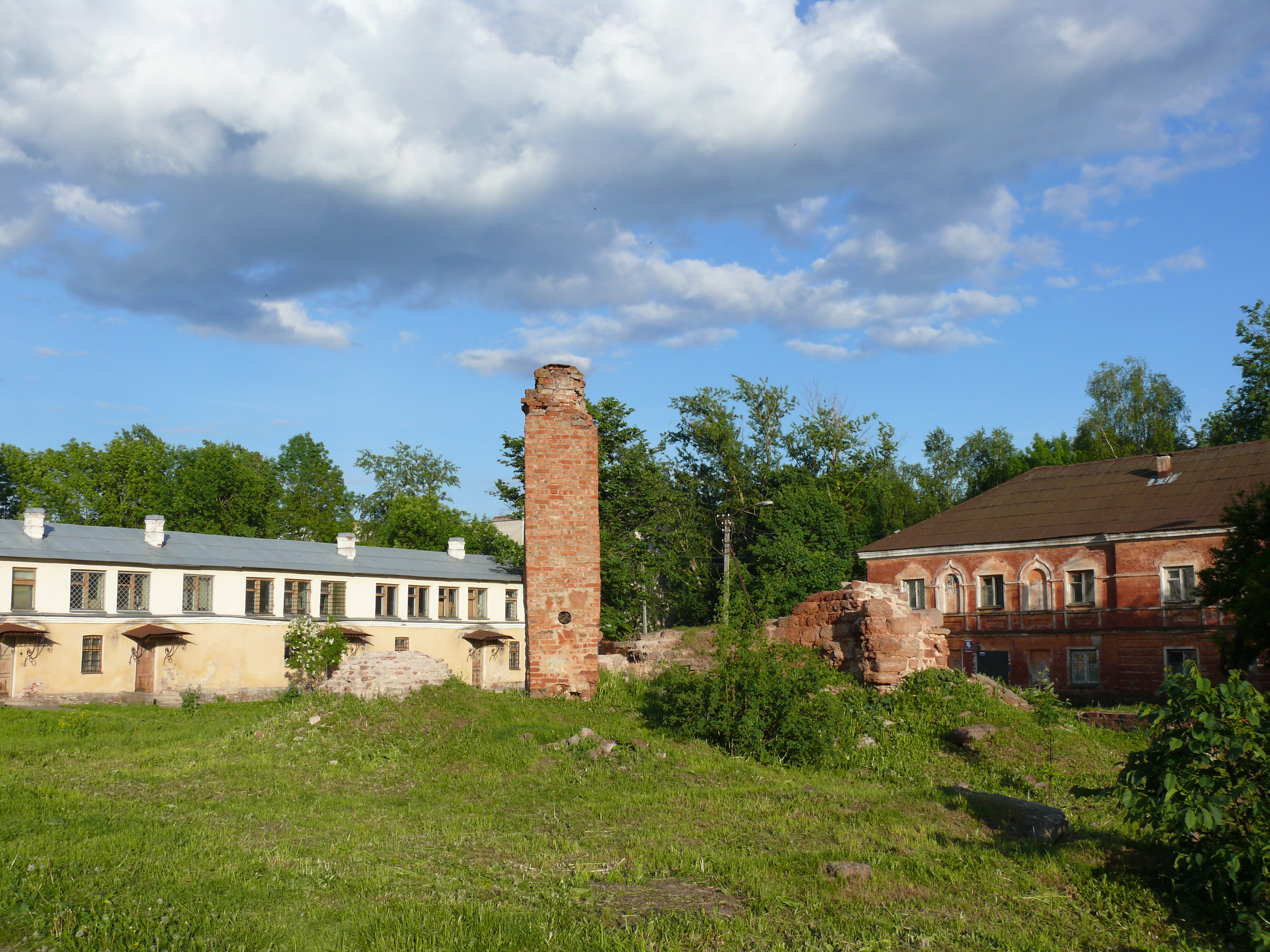
The ruins of church of the Nativity in summer

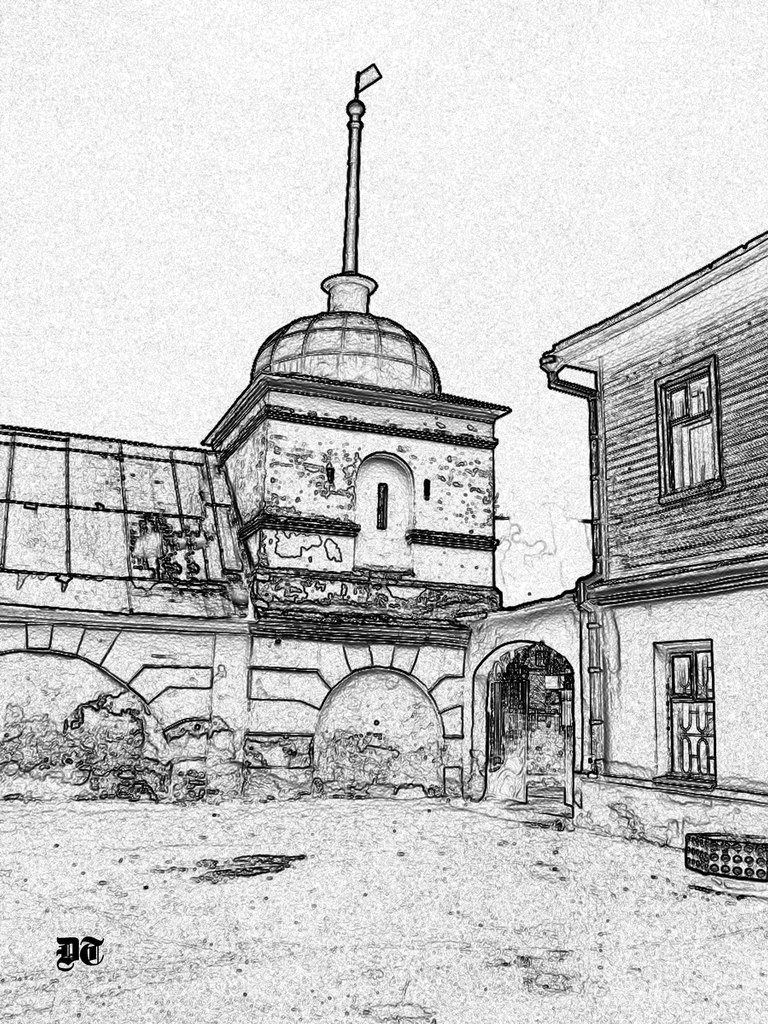
The north-eastern corner tower in December 2014

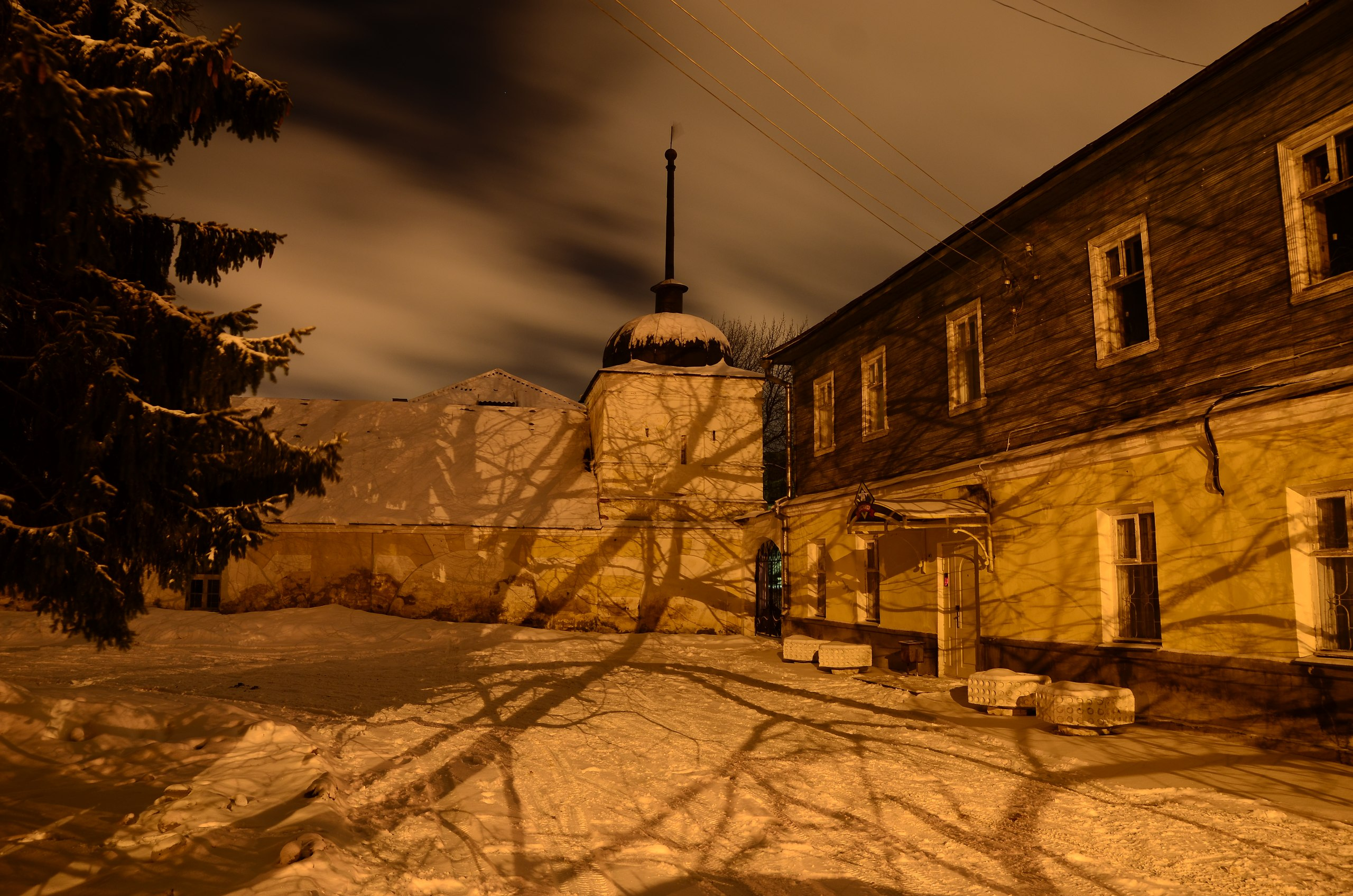
The corner tower in February 2015

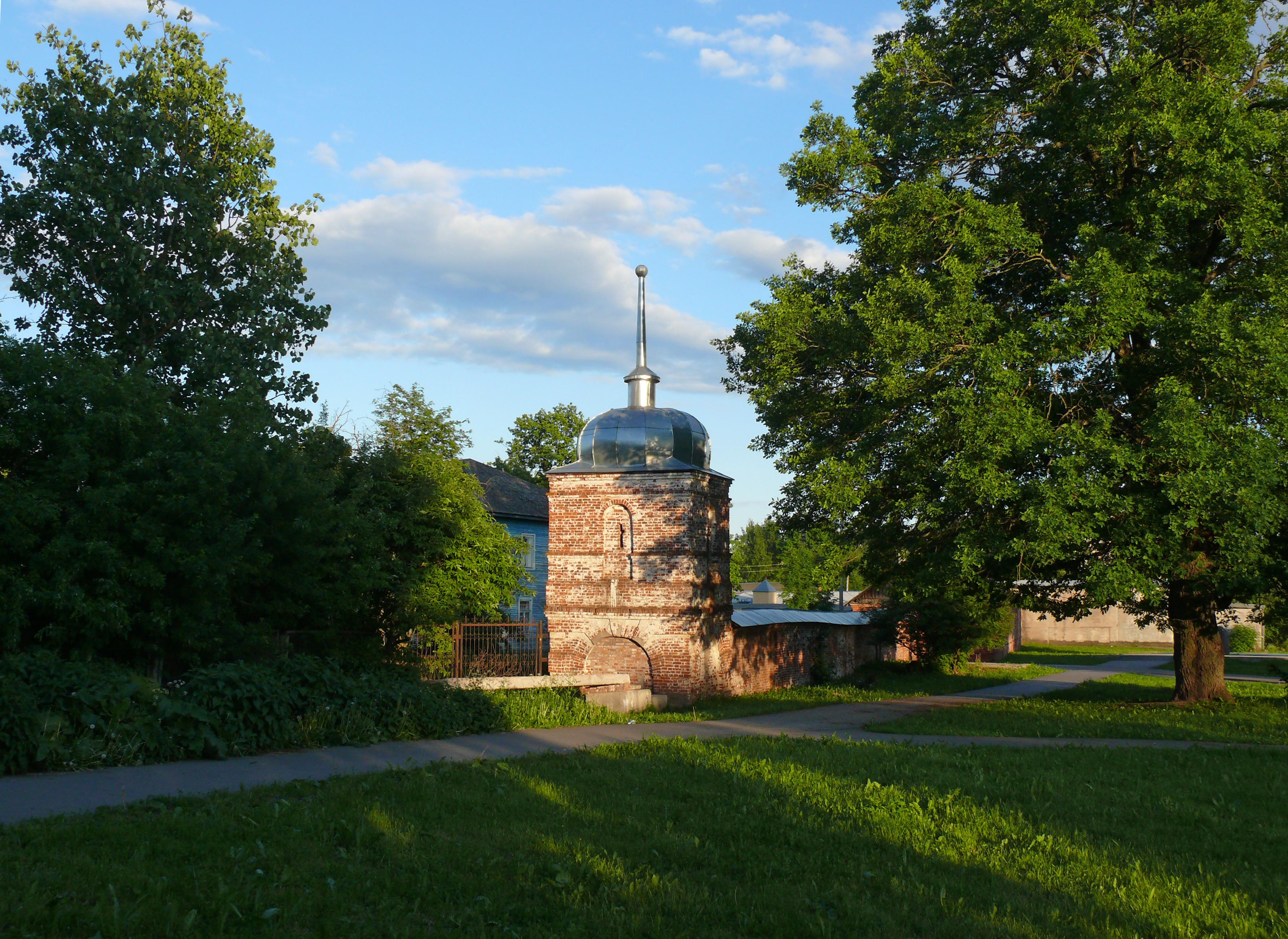
The north-west corner tower

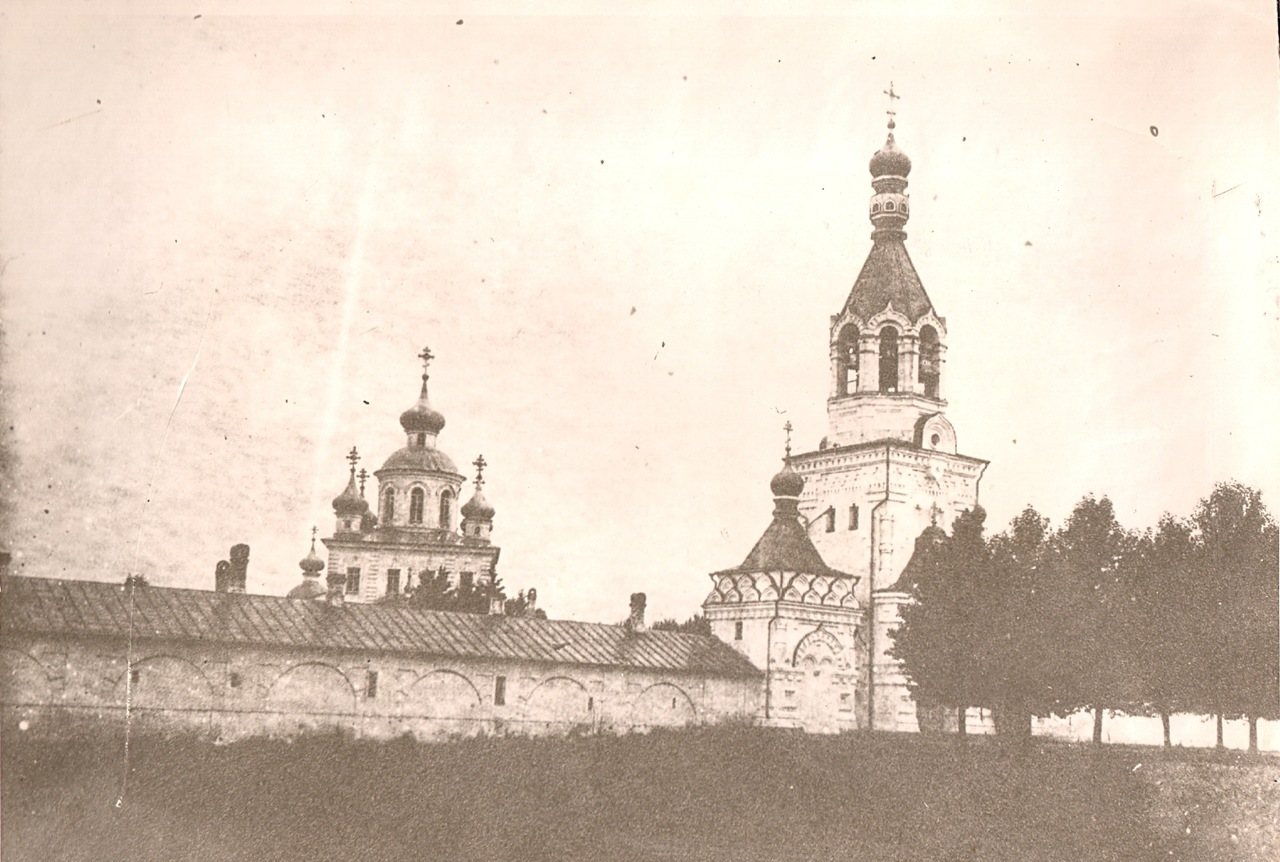
The monastery in 1912

== See also ==
- Veliky Novgorod
- Novgorod republic
- Administrative divisions of the Novgorod Republic
- Moscovy
- Russian empire
- Our Lady of the Sign (Novgorod)
- Katholikon of the Antoniev Monastery
- Peryn
- Novgorod massacre
- De la Gardie Campaign
- Leningrad–Novgorod Offensive
