= 1790 in literature =

This article contains information about the literary events and publications of 1790.

== Events ==
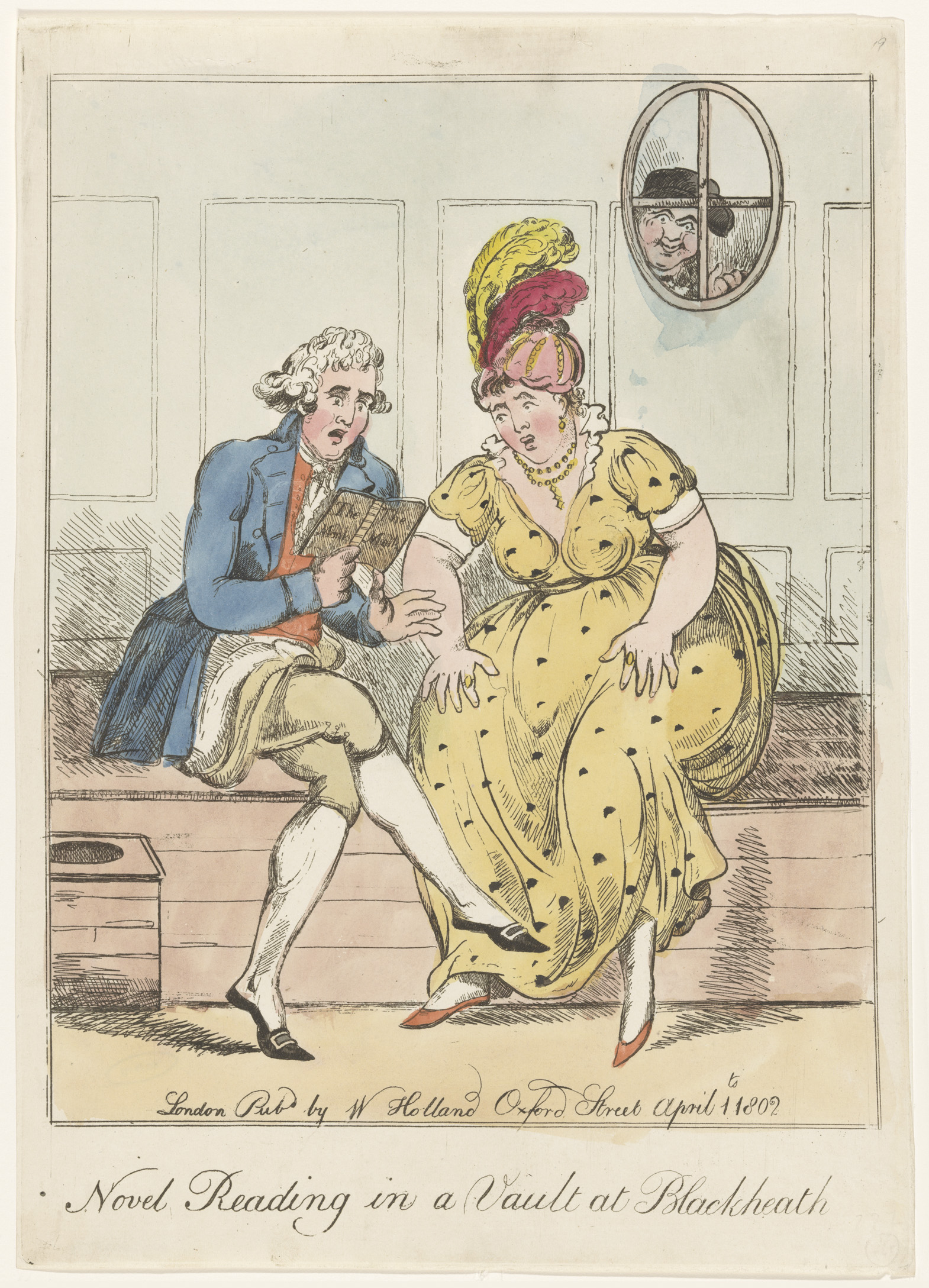
This 1802 caricature of a couple reading Matthew Lewis's The Monk in the water closet satirizes readers of "horrid" (i.e. Gothic) novels. (Rijksmuseum)

- February – Xavier de Maistre begins writing Voyage autour de ma chambre (Voyage Around my Room, published 1794) while under arrest in Turin in the Kingdom of Sardinia, as the result of a duel.
- May – Following the death of Thomas Warton, William Hayley refuses an offer to succeed him as Poet Laureate of Great Britain. Retired MP Henry James Pye is appointed in his place.
- May 31 – United States President George Washington approves the Copyright Act of 1790.
- June 1 – The Royal Literary Fund is founded in Britain by David Williams.
- June 9 – John Barrie's Philadelphia Spelling Book Arranged Upon a Plan Entirely New becomes the first American book copyrighted.
- unknown date – William Lane establishes the Minerva Press in London, specializing in Gothic fiction.

== New books ==
=== Fiction ===
- Mary Pilkington – Delia
- Ann Radcliffe – A Sicilian Romance
- Helen Maria Williams – Julia

=== Drama ===
- Johann Wolfgang von Goethe – Torquato Tasso (completed)
- William Hayley – Eudora
- Thomas Holcroft – The German Hotel
- Edmond Malone (editor) – The Plays and Poems of William Shakespeare
- Leandro Fernández de Moratín – El viejo y la niña (The Old Man and the Young Girl, published)
- Mariana Starke – The Widow of Malabar
- August von Kotzebue
  - Die Indianer in England (The Indians in England)
  - Menschenhass und Reue (Misanthropy and Repentance)
  - (as Knigge) – Doktor Bahrdt mit der eisernen Stirn (Doctor Bahrdt with the Iron Brow)

=== Poetry ===
- William Blake – The Marriage of Heaven and Hell
- Robert Burns – "Tam o' Shanter"

=== Non-fiction ===
- Samuel Ayscough – An Index to the Remarkable Passages and Words Made Use of by Shakespeare, first Shakespeare concordance published
- James Bruce – Travels to Discover the Source of the Nile
- Edmund Burke – Reflections on the Revolution in France
- Hannah More – An Estimate of the Religion of the Fashionable World
- Jean Paul – Leben des vergnügten Schulmeisterlein Maria Wutz (Life of the Devoted School Mistress MW)
- Alexander Radishchev – Journey from St. Petersburg to Moscow
- Louis Claude de Saint-Martin – L'Homme de désir
- Mary Wollstonecraft – A Vindication of the Rights of Men

== Births ==
- January 1 – James Wills, Irish poet (died 1868)
- January 10 – Anders Abraham Grafström, Swedish historian, priest and poet (died 1870)
- January 29 – George Métivier, Guernsey poet writing in Guernésiais (died 1881)
- March 3 – John Austin, English legal philosopher (died 1859)
- March 10 – Jacques Arago, French traveller and writer (died 1855)
- March 18 – Marquis de Custine, French aristocrat and travel writer (died 1857)
- June 9 – Abel-François Villemain, French politician and writer (died 1870)
- June 24 – Helena Ekblom, Swedish writer and preacher (died 1859)
- July 8 – Fitz-Greene Halleck, American poet (died 1867)
- August 8 – Ferenc Kölcsey, Hungarian poet and critic (died 1838)
- October 1 – Charlotte Elizabeth Tonna, English novelist (died 1846)
- October 21 – Alphonse de Lamartine, French poet (died 1869)
- December 8 – Richard Carlile, English advocate of suffrage and press freedom (died 1843)
- December 25 – Anna Eliza Bray, English novelist and travel writer (died 1883)
- Unknown date — Mary Diana Dods (also as David Lyndsay and Walter Sholto Douglas), Scottish writer (died 1830 in literature)

== Deaths ==
- February 19 – Thomas de Mahy, marquis de Favras, man of letters (born 1744; executed)
- March 20 – Thomas Richards of Coychurch, cleric and lexicographer (born c.1710)
- April 3 – Ephraim Kuh, German poet, 58/9
- April 29 – Charles-Nicolas Cochin, French art critic (born 1715)
- May 2 – Martin Madan, English writer and cleric (born 1726)
- May 6 – Jacques Antoine Hippolyte, Comte de Guibert, French military writer (born 1743)
- May 21 – Thomas Warton, English poet and literary historian (born 1798)
- July 7 – François Hemsterhuis, Dutch philosopher (born 1721)
- July 17 – Adam Smith, Scottish philosopher and political economist (born 1723)
- July 25 – William Livingston, American political writer and politician (born 1723)
- unknown date – Maria Vittoria Ottoboni, Italian stage actress, writer and salonist (b. 1721)
- probable – Marc-Antoine Eidous, French encyclopedist (born c. 1724)
