= Dodwell =

Dodwell is a surname. Notable people with the surname include:

- Charles Reginald Dodwell (1922–1994), English art historian
- Christina Dodwell (born 1951), explorer and travel writer
- Edward Dodwell (1767–1832), Irish writer on archaeology
- Grant Dodwell (born 1952), Australian producer, actor, writer and director
- H. H. Dodwell (1879–1946), English academic in India
- Henry Dodwell (1641–1711), Irish scholar, theologian and writer
- Henry Dodwell (priest) 17th century Anglican priest in Ireland
- Henry Dodwell (religious controversialist) (1706–1784), satirist, son of Henry
- Sam Dodwell (1909–1990), English painter
- William Dodwell (1709–1785), theological writer, son of Henry

== See also ==
- Dodwell, hamlet in Luddington, Warwickshire, England
- Dodwell & Co., 19th century British merchant firms in China and Japan
