= Henry Dodwell (disambiguation) =

Henry Dodwell (1641–1711) was an Anglo-Irish scholar, theologian and controversial writer.

Henry Dodwell may also refer to:

- Henry Dodwell (religious controversialist) (1706–1784), British religious controversialist and lawyer
- Henry Dodwell (priest), Anglican priest in Ireland
- H. H. Dodwell (Henry Herbert Dodwell, 1879–1946), historian
