= Francis Brokesby =

Francis Brokesby or Brookesbuy (29 September 1637 – buried 24 October 1714), was a nonjuror.

== Early life and career ==
Brokesby was born on 29 September 1637, the son of Obadiah Brokesby, a gentleman of independent fortune, of Stoke Golding, Leicestershire, and his wife Elizabeth, daughter of John Pratt, Wellingborough, Northamptonshire. His uncle Nathaniel was a schoolmaster. As all the nine children of his grandfather Francis received scriptural names, it is likely that he came of Puritan stock.

He became a member and afterwards a fellow of Trinity College, Cambridge, taking the degree of B.D. in 1666. A religious poem of some beauty composed by him on the occasion of his taking his degree illustrates the fervent piety of his character. He probably took orders early, for on the presentation of his college he succeeded John Warren, the ejected vicar of Hatfield Broad Oak, Essex. He lived on friendly terms with his predecessor, who used to come and hear him preach.

In 1670 he left Broad Oak, and became rector of Rowley, East Riding of Yorkshire. Soon after he entered on this new cure he married Isabella, daughter of a Mr Wood of Kingston upon Hull. From about this time onwards he used to write in his pocket-books short Latin memoranda on the incidents of his daily life. Several specimens of these memoranda have been preserved. Though they give some idea of his peculiar piety, they are mostly concerned with domestic matters.

During his incumbency at Rowley he appears to have been involved in several disputes and lawsuits about tithes. He refers to these disputes in his memoranda of 1678 and 1680; on 31 July 1683 he enters a thanksgiving for the successful issue of a suit, and in the same year registers a vow that if he gains a cause then pending he will devote half the tithe so recovered to the relief of the poor.

== Life as a nonjuror ==
When the revolution of 1688 set William III and Mary II on the throne, Brokesby refused to take the oath to the new sovereigns. He was accordingly deprived of his living in 1690. He went up to London in July, and appears to have been received by Lady Fairborn at her house in Pall Mall 'over against the Pastures.' Meanwhile, his wife, by that time the mother of six children, did what she could to wind up affairs. Writing to her sister on 8 Aug, she says, 'We are now cutting down our corn, for we cannot sell it.' After his deprivation Brokesby lived for some years in his native village, and there his wife died and was buried on 26 February 1699.

Brokesby's private property seems to have been small. His high character and his reputation as a scholar gained him many friends among the men of his own party. Chief among these was Francis Cherry of Shottesbrooke, Berkshire, to whose liberal kindness Thomas Hearne and many other nonjurors were indebted. After his wife's death Brokesby appears to have resided constantly at Shottesbrooke, and early in 1706 succeeded Mr Gilbert of St John's College, Oxford, as chaplain to the little society of nonjurors established there. He travelled about a good deal, and generally paid a yearly round of visits in the north of England, probably to the men of his own party, occasionally also going up to Oxford and London. At Shottesbrooke he enjoyed the society of Robert Nelson, to whom he rendered valuable assistance in the compilation of his book on the Festivals and Fasts of the Church. There, too, he formed a strong friendship with Henry Dodwell, sometime Camden Professor of History at Oxford.

In common with some other moderate nonjurors, Brokesby refused to take the oath simply because his conscience forbade him to do so, and not as a matter of politics. He declared that if James were dead, he would have no objection to swearing allegiance to William and Mary, because they would be in possession, while the claim of the Prince of Wales would be 'dubious'. The death of James, however, was followed by the oath of abjuration, and neither Brokesby nor his friends were prepared to declare that the kingship of William of Orange was founded on right.

At the same time, while he warmly upheld the cause of the deprived bishops, ecclesiastical division was grievous to him, and he fully shared in the opinion expressed in Henry Dodwell's work, 'The Case in View,' that on the death or resignation of these bishops their party might return to the national communion. The case contemplated by Dodwell became a fact when the death of Bishop Lloyd on 1 January 1710 was followed by the resignation of Bishop Ken, and accordingly Brokesby, Dodwell and Nelson returned to the communion of the established church, and attended service at Shottesbrooke Church on 28 February. A letter from S. Parker of Oxford, dated 12 November, appears to have called forth a reply dated 18 November, in which Brokesby shows that 'the new bishops' were merely suffragans, that no synodical denunciation had invested them with independent authority after the deaths of the deprived diocesans, that the 'deprived fathers' had no power to invest them with such authority, and that therefore they were not diocesan bishops. Brokesby, then, had no part in what may be described as the schism of the nonjurors.

He lost his friend Dodwell in 1711, and the next year he describes himself in his will, dated 15 September 1712, as sojourning at Hinckley. He was then in good health. The death of Francis Cherry in 1713 caused him deep grief.

He died at Hinckley, and was buried at Stoke on 24 October 1714. Of his six children, his elder son Francis died in early life, and his younger son, who became a merchant, also died before him. His four daughters survived him; the second, Dorothy, married Samuel Parr, vicar of Hinckley, and was thus the grandmother of Dr Samuel Parr, the famous Greek scholar.

== Works ==
Brokesby was the author of:

- Some Proposals towards promoting the Propagation of the Gospel in our American Plantations, 1708, 8vo.
- A tract entitled Of Education with respect to Grammar Schools and the Universities, to which is annexed a Letter of Advice to a Young Gentleman. By F. B., B.D., 1701, 12mo.
- 'A Letter containing an Account of some Observations relating to the Antiquities and Natural History of England', 16 May 1711, in Hearne's Leland's Itinerary, vi. preface, and 89-107, ed. 1744.
- An History of the Government of the Primitive Church for the first three centuries and the beginning of the fourth … wherein also the Suggestions of David Blondel … are considered, 1712, 8vo.
- The Divine Right of Church Government by Bishops asserted, 1714, 8vo.
- The Life of Mr. Henry Dodwell, with an Account of his Work …, 2 vols. 1715, 8vo. In this work, which was published after the author's death, he speaks (p. 311) of the help Dodwell had given him in preparing his book on church government.

Various Letters.
