= List of fiction set in Geneva =

This is a list of fiction set in Geneva — including the city of Geneva and the Canton of Geneva, in Switzerland.

Title	Year	Type	Author	Publisher	Ref.
8½ Women	1999	Film	Peter Greenaway	Movie Masters	
Ada, or Ardor: A Family Chronicle	1969	Novel	Vladimir Nabokov	McGraw Hill	
Ajnabee	2001	Film	Robin Bhatt, Shyam Goel, Neeraj Vora	Venus Records & Tapes	
Angels & Demons	2000	Novel	Dan Brown	Atria Books	
The Aquitaine Progression	1984	Thriller	Robert Ludlum	Random House	
Ashenden; Or the British Agent	1927	Story collection	W. Somerset Maugham	Heinemann	
Barood	1976	Film	Sachin Bhowmick		
Biały mazur	1979	Film	Wanda Jakubowska		
Black Panther: Wakanda Forever	2022	Film	Ryan Coogler, Joe Robert Cole	Marvel Studios	
Chaos	2001	Film	Coline Serreau		
Contagion	2011	Film	Scott Z. Burns	Participant Media, Imagenation Abu Dhabi	
Critical Code	2026	Comic	Fabian Menor	Foundation for Geneva	
The Czar: A Tale of the Time of the First Napoleon	1895	Novel	Deborah Alcock	T. Nelson and Sons	
Damascus Gate	1998	Novel	Robert Stone	Houghton Mifflin	
Die Ducks in den Alpen	2014	Comic	Jan Gulbransson	Egmont Comic Collection	
Doctor Fischer of Geneva	1980	Novel	Graham Greene	The Bodley Head	
Dreams of Love	1947	Film	René Fauchois, Jean Ferry, Christian Stengel	Pathé Consortium Cinéma	
Eine Reise nach Genf. Ein Siggi-Baumeister-Krimi: Ein Siggi-Baumeister-Roman	2001	Mystery novel	Jacques Berndorf	Goldmann	
Eleven Minutes	2003	Novel	Paulo Coelho	Rocco	
English Without Tears	1944	Film	Terence Rattigan, Anatole de Grunwald	Two Cities Films	
The Fear Index	2011	Novel	Robert Harris	Hutchinson Publishing	
Frankenstein	1818	Novel	Mary Shelley	Lackington, Hughes, Harding, Mavor & Jones	
Geneva	1938	Play	George Bernard Shaw		
Geneva	2023	Novel	Richard Armitage	Pegasus Crime	
GENEVA - A Novel of International Intrigue	2012	Thriller novel	Julia Michelle Dawson	Windhamer Publishing & Media	
The Geneva Affair	2011	Novel	Nicolae Klepper	Haret Books	
The Geneva Connection	2012	Thriller novel	Martin Bodenham	Musa Publishing	
The Geneva Option: A Yael Azoulay Novel	2013	Spy novel	Adam LeBor	HarperCollins	
The Geneva Seduction	2010	Novel	Fritz Galt	Independently published	
The Geneva Trap: A Liz Carlyle Novel	2012	Spy novel	Stella Rimington	Bloomsbury USA	
A Heart Bent out of Shape	2013	Novel	Emylia Hall	Headline Book Publishing	
Her Fearful Symmetry	2009	Horror novel	Audrey Niffenegger	Random House	
Hotel du Lac	1984	Novel	Anita Brookner	Jonathan Cape	
The House of the White Shadows	1903	Novel	B. L. Farjeon	New Amsterdam Book Company	
Isabelle Eberhardt	1991	Film	Stephen Sewell	Les Films Aramis	
Jonah Who Will Be 25 in the Year 2000	1976	Film	John Berger, Alain Tanner	Citel Films	
Kaleidoscope	1966	Film	Robert Carrington, Jane-Howard Hammerstein	Winkast Film Productions	
Kings Row	1942	Film	Casey Robinson	Warner Bros. Pictures	
The Lost Art of Keeping Secrets	2005	Novel	Eva Rice	Penguin Publishing Group	
The Lost Symbol	2009	Thriller novel	Dan Brown	Doubleday	
Lovers	2020	Film	Nicole Garcia, Jacques Fieschi	Mars Films, France 3 Cinéma	
A Man Astray	194-	Film	Harald G. Petersson. Walter Zerlett-Olfenius	Tobis Film	
The Man in the High Castle	1962	Science fiction	Philip K. Dick	Putnam	
Man of the Moment	1955	Film	John Paddy Carstairs, Maurice Cowan, Vernon Sylvaine	Rank Organisation	
Muppets Most Wanted	2014	Film	James Bobin, Nicholas Stoller	Walt Disney Production	
Mystery at Geneva: An Improbable Tale of Singular Happenings	1922	Mystery novel	Rose Macaulay	W. Collins, Sons & Co. Ltd.	
Obsession	2018	Romance novel	Emily Lemon	Independently published	
"The Pension Beaurepas"	1879	Short story	Henry James	The Atlantic Monthly	
Ransomed	2023	Film	Kim Jeong-yeon, Yeo Mi-jeong	Wind Up Film	
Rollo in Geneva	1867	Children's adventure novel	Jacob Abbott	Sheldon & Company	
Sekunde Null Das Urknall-Experiment: Wird das Schwarze Loch von Genf die Erde verschlingen?	2010	Thriller novel	Froböse, Rolf	Vito von Eichborn	
Snowden	2016	Film	Kieran Fitzgerald, Oliver Stone	Endgame Entertainment	
Soldaten. Nekrolog auf Genf (Soldiers: An Obituary for Geneva)	1967	Play	Rolf Hochhuth		
The Stress of Her Regard	1989	Science fiction novel	Tim Powers	Ace Books	
A Study In Shadows	1908	Novel	William John Locke	John Lane Company	
The Sweet Body of Deborah	1968	Film	Ernesto Gastaldi, Luciano Martino	Flora Film, Zenith Cinematografica	
Tender is the Night	1934	Novel	F. Scott Fitzgerald	Charles Scribner's Sons	
Three Colors: Red	1994	Film	Krzysztof Kieślowski	France 3 Cinéma	
Two Girls from the Red Star	1966	Film	Klaus Peter Schreiner	Chronos Films	
Two Weeks in Geneva: Book One	2014	Novel	Lydia Rowan	Kindle Direct Publishing	
Two Weeks in Geneva: Book Two	2014	Novel	Lydia Rowan	Kindle Direct Publishing	
Two Weeks in Geneva: Book Three	2014	Novel	Lydia Rowan	Kindle Direct Publishing	
The Unbearable Lightness of Being	1988	Film	Jean-Claude Carrière, Philip Kaufman	The Saul Zaentz Company	
Under Western Eyes	1911	Novel	Joseph Conrad	Harper & Brothers	
A Very Private Affair	1962	Film	Jean-Paul Rappeneau, Louis Malle		
Voyage autour de ma chambre (A Journey Around My Room)	1794	Short Story	Xavier de Maistre		
The Wolf of Wall Street	2013	Film	Terence Winter	Red Granite Pictures, Sikelia Productions, Appian Way Productions	
