= Eliza Berkeley =

English author (1734–1800)

Eliza Berkeley (née Frinsham; 1734–1800) was an English author. She was connected to the Blue Stockings Society, and after bereavements in the 1790s began to edit family papers, and write on her own account.

== Biography ==
She was born in 1734 at the vicarage of White Waltham in Windsor Forest. Her father, the vicar, was the Rev. Henry Frinsham, previously curate at Beaconsfield; her mother was a daughter of Francis Cherry of Shottesbrook House, Berkshire, who left a fortune, diminished by the South Sea Bubble, to Mrs. Frinsham and her sisters, known as Duke Cherry, Black Cherry, and Heart Cherry. Lord Bute rented Waltham Place to be near Henry Frinsham, and he frequently played cards at the vicarage. Here Eliza Berkeley passed her childhood, since her father would not accept preferment on condition of voting against his principles.

A tomboy at six, Eliza at 11 wrote two sermons. She and her sister Anne were placed at Mrs. Sheeles's school, Queen Square, London. for a year, until their father's death. She read Hickes's Preparatory Office for Death every Thursday, and attended prayers at church every afternoon.'

In 1754, Eliza being in her twentieth year, her mother died. She and her sister succeeded to her large fortune, and they took a house in Windsor. She was a little creature, and very short-sighted; she read Spanish, Hebrew, and French, always taking a Spanish prayer-book to church. She was intimate with Catherine Talbot, and she knew Elizabeth Carter, Elizabeth Montagu, George Lyttelton, 1st Baron Lyttelton, and the rest of their set.

In 1761 Eliza married the Rev. George Berkeley. Her husband's livings during the first ten years of her married life were Bray, Acton, and Cookham. In 1763 at Bray, on 8 February, she gave birth to her son, George Monck Berkeley, having at this time ague, and being exposed to the danger of smallpox, which was then endemic. In 1766 she gave birth to her second son, George Robert, and after weaning him she was inoculated at Acton rectory by Mr. Sutton, and devoted herself to the education of these two sons.

In 1771 Dr. Berkeley became prebendary of Canterbury, and they then went to reside at The Oaks, the area at Canterbury Cathedral which had once been the monastery garden. Eliza, supported by her friend Susanna Duncombe, became a dominant figure in the group of wives of the chapter.

On 15 April 1775 her second son George Robert, nearly nine years old, died. After their son (George) Monck had been to Eton College, the family went to live in Scotland during the time he passed at the University of St Andrews. From 1780 Monck's health caused anxiety, and for ten years from this, Eliza Berkeley moved around England in a group with husband, sister, and her son; but in January 1793 Monck died. In January 1795 her husband died, and in January 1797 her sister died. She became markedly eccentric.

Eliza Berkeley dates from several places in the last three years of her life, Chertsey, Henley, Oxford, Sackville Street; she died at Kensington in 1800, aged 66. By her own desire her body, which was first to be taken to Oxford, was conveyed to Cheltenham and buried there in the same tomb with her son. She was charitable, and with other benevolent works she paid an annuity up to her death to Richard Brenan, who had been Jonathan Swift's servant at the end of his life.

== Works ==
Eliza Berkeley edited a volume of the poetical works of her son, and sermons of her husband's (1799). She was also an opinionated contributor to the Gentleman's Magazine.

In 1797, her edition of her sons Poems was published, by John Nichols. The Preface of 630 pages, ostensibly a memoir of the poet, was personal and discursive, and at the time of publication was taken to be absurd. The poems cover 178 pages; there is also a postscript.

== Family ==
In 1761, Eliza married the Rev. George Berkeley (1733–1795), son of Bishop George Berkeley. They had two sons:

- George Monck Berkeley (1763–1793)
- George Robert Berkeley (1766–1775)
