= Woolley Green =

Woolley Green may refer to:

- Woolley Green, Berkshire
- Woolley Green, Wiltshire
