= Antoni Martí Monterde =

Spanish writer and academic

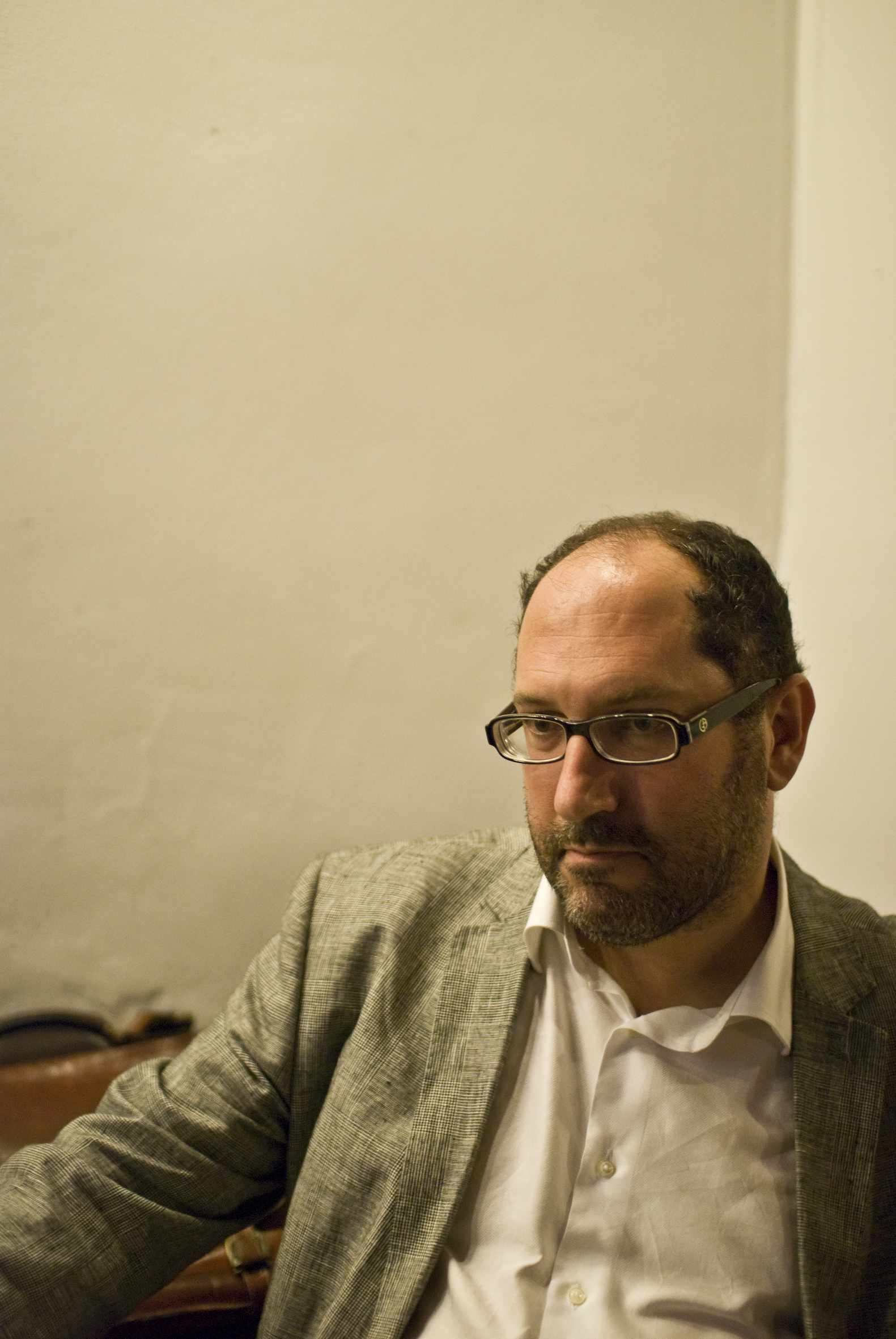
- Antoni Martí Monterde
- Born: 1968 (age 57–58); Torís (Land of Valencia), Spain
- Occupations: writer and teacher
- Notable work: L'Erosió

Antoni Martí Monterde is a Spanish writer and university teacher. He teaches Literary Theory and Comparative Literature at University of Barcelona. He writes both articles about literature and a creative work which was recognised by Crítica dels Escriptors Valencians Award in 2002 for L’erosió. He is a member of the Association of Catalan Language Writers.

== Biography ==
Professor of Literature and Comparative Literary Theory at Barcelona University. Aside from numerous articles on Josep Pla, Walter Benjamin, Joan Fuster and Xavier de Maistre, has already written the essays J. V. Foix o la solitud de l'escriptura (Premi Joaquim Xirau 1997, Edicions 62, 1998), a study of avant-garde poetry, and is co-author of Literary Theory and Comparative Literary Theory, (2005).

He has also published the poems: Els vianants (1995) and the stories: L'erosió 2001; Valencian Writers Prize (2002), a travel diary in Argentina. His experiences in L'erosió inspired his book, Poética del Café. Un espacio de la modernidad literaria europea, (finalist for the Anagrama Essay Prize, 2007) which explored the evolution and current situation of literary cafès around the world.

== Works ==
- Sobre el desordre (On Disorder, 1992),
- Els Vianants (Wayfarers, 1995).
- L’erosió (Erosion, 2001). (republished in 2019)
- J.V. Foix o la solitud de l’escriptura (J. V. Foix or the Solitude of the Act of Writing, Edicions 62, 1998)
- Poética del Café. Un espacio de la modernidad literaria europea (Anagrama, 2007)
- Un somni europeu. Història intel·lectual de la Literatura Comparada (2015)
- El far de Løndstrup. Assaig sobre la memòria moral dels espais (2015; premi Càtedra Blasco 2013)
- Joan Fuster: la paraula assaig (2019)
- París, Madrid, Nova York: Les ciutats de lluny de Josep Pla (Editorial 3i4, 2019)

== Awards ==
- 1994 Guerau de Liost Prize for Els Vianants (Wayfarers, 1995).
- 1998 Joaquím Xirau Prize for J.V. Foix o la solitud de l’escriptura
- 2002 Valencian Writers Critics Prize for l'Erosió
- 2018 Premi Octubre for Les ciutats de lluny de Josep Pla
- 2019 Premi Josep Vicent Marqués d'assaig (Premis Ciutat de València) with L'home impacient. (Diaris 1996-1998)
