= Thomas of Otterbourne =

Two English chroniclers

Thomas of Otterbourne is the name of two English medieval chroniclers, very often confused. The later Thomas wrote in the early 15th century and covers in detail the reign of Richard II of England, extending to 1420. The text was printed in 1732 by Thomas Hearne, with that of John Whethamstede.

The earlier Thomas of Otterbourne was a Franciscan, active in the middle of the fourteenth century. The two were regarded as probably the same man by the Dictionary of National Biography, but this view is rejected by Antonia Gransden, who tentatively identifies him as the rector in 1393 of Chingford. They are also regarded as different by the Encyclopedia of the Medieval Chronicle.
