= Mariana Starke =

English author (1762–1838)

- Born: 30 September 1762; Epsom, Surrey
- Died: 1 April 1838 (aged 75); Milan
- Occupations: Travel writer, dramatist, translator, poet
- Relatives: Thomas Starke (great-grandfather)
- Writing career
- Language: English
- Notable works: Letters from Italy (1800), Travels on the Continent (1820), Travels in Europe (1828

Mariana Starke (1762–1838) was an influential English travel writer, though she also worked in other genres. She is best known for her travel guides to France and Italy, popular with British travellers to the Continent in the early nineteenth century. She wrote plays early in her career, before embarking on her first trip abroad in 1791. She worked as a translator over most of her working life, and latterly, also wrote poetry.

== Life and writing career ==
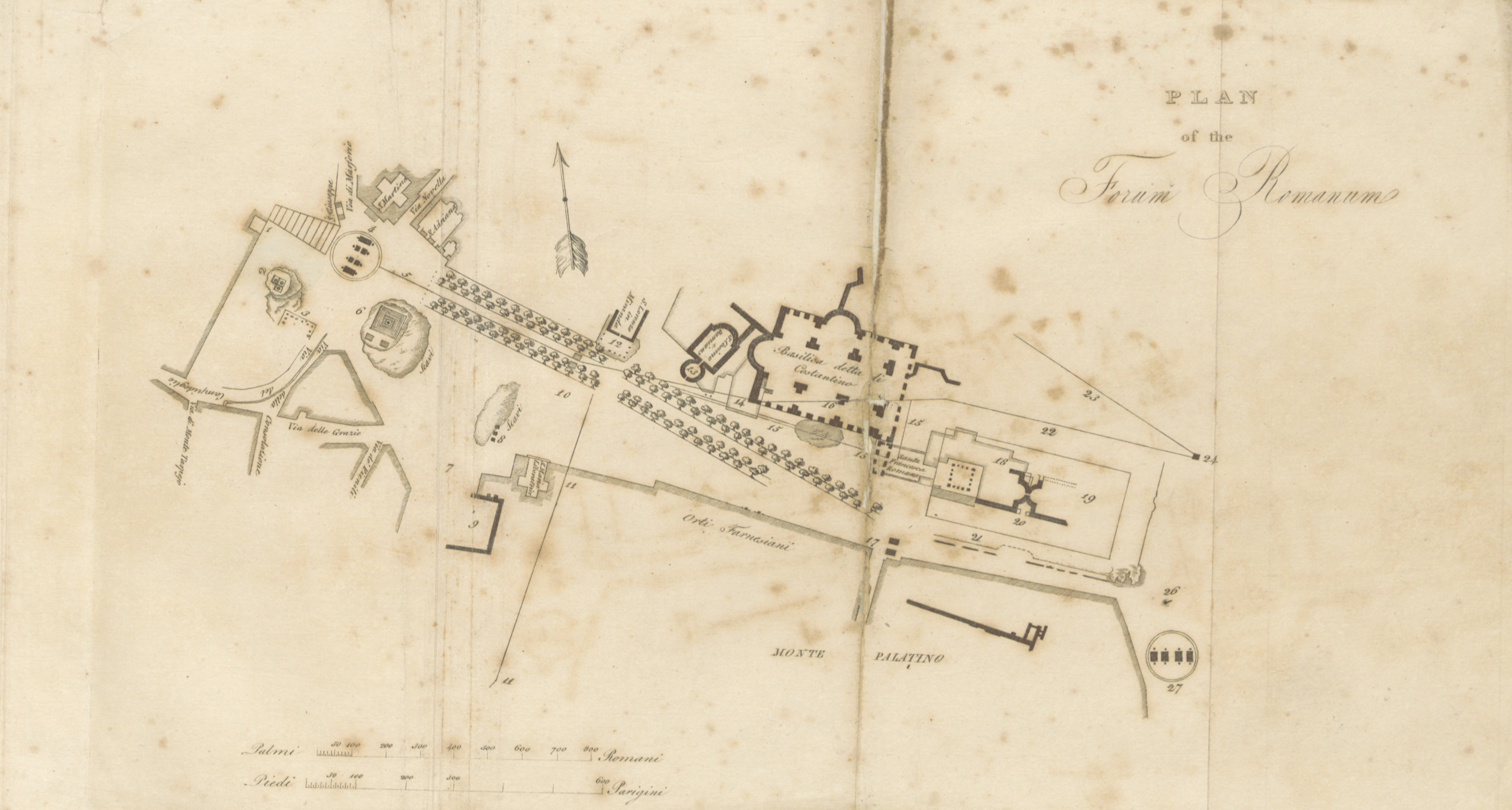
Plan of the Roman Forum, Travels in Europe between the years 1824 and 1828 ... Comprising an historical account of Sicily, etc. (London, 1828, p. 149)

Starke's mother was Mary (née Hughes) and her father was Richard Starke (1719–1793), an employee of the East India Company and former deputy-governor of Fort St George in Madras (now known as Chennai). For years scholars believed Starke had been born in India, but it is now accepted that she was born in Surrey, her parents' second child but the first to survive. She had two younger siblings: Louisa (1772-1792) and Richard (born 1768). Starke was raised at her family's estate, Hylands House, at Epsom. Starke's great-grandfather was Thomas Starke (c. 1649-1704), a Virginia landowner and "one of the first – and leading – London slave traders."

Starke had many literary connections over the course of her career. Writer and biographer William Hayley was a family friend and he mentored Starke from a young age. At the beginning of her career, she collaborated with Millecent Parkhurst and George Monck Berkeley. Writer Catherine Maria Fanshawe was a family friend. She and her mother were also part of a circle of Epsom women interested in literature. Later, Starke became a friend of writer Mary Champion de Crespigny and dedicated two of her works to her.

Starke began her career writing plays. Her first publication, in 1787, was an anonymous translation, co-authored with her friend Millecent Parkhurst, of Madame de Genlis’s Théâtre de l'éducation. Her family had vested interests in India since her grandfather's time, and she used that country as a background for the first of her plays to be professionally produced, The Sword of Peace (1788). Her second professional production, the successful The Widow of Malabar (1790), "[e]mbellished with the rituals of Indian sati – a burning funeral pyre – and with specially composed music, ... was something of a spectacle." It was published by the Minerva Press.

Starke accompanied her parents and sister to France and Italy for an extended period, between 1791 and 1798. The whole family, other than Starke herself, had tuberculosis, and she attended and nursed them. Her sister Louisa died months after setting out, in 1792, and Richard Starke died in 1794. This experience of expatriate life formed the basis for much of her later writing. After the end of the Napoleonic Wars, Starke returned to Italy and devoted the rest of her life to revisions of her travel guides, effectively reinventing the genre. Compiling a bibliography of her work is a complicated task as she frequently revised her guides and sometimes changed their titles.

== Development of the travel guide ==
Earlier travel guides traditionally concentrated on architectural and scenic descriptions of the places usually visited by wealthy young men on the Grand Tour. Starke recognised that with the enormous growth in the number of Britons travelling abroad after 1815, the majority of her potential readers were now travelling in family groups and often on a budget. She, in response, included for the first time a wealth of advice on luggage, obtaining passports, the precise cost of food and accommodation in each city, and, perhaps not surprisingly given her own experience, advice on the care of invalid family members. She also devised a system of exclamation marks [!!!] used as ratings, a forerunner of today's star classifications. Starke's travel guides, initially published by John Murray, went into many editions and were often pirated. The ninth and final edition of Travels in Europe was published in 1839.

Her books served as templates for later guides and earned her celebrity status in her lifetime. The French author Stendhal, in his 1839 novel The Charterhouse of Parma, refers to a travelling British historian who "never paid for the smallest trifle without first looking up its price in the Travels of a certain Mrs Starke, a book which...indicates to the prudent Englishman the cost of a turkey, an apple, a glass of milk and so forth."

== Works ==
=== Plays ===
- Anonymous translation, with Millecent Parkhurst (later Thomas), of Madame de Genlis’s Theatre of Education 4 vols. London: J. Walter, 1787. (Internet Archive: Vol. I, II, III, IV)
- With George Monck Berkeley. Ethelinda. (unproduced & unpublished)
- The Sword of Peace; or, a voyage of love; a Comedy in five acts. First performed at the Theatre Royal in the Hay-Market, on Saturday, August the 9th, 1788. London: J. Debrett / Dublin: Hannah Chamberlaine, 1789. (published anonymously; Etext)
- The British Orphan. (unpublished; produced privately in 1790)
- The Widow of Malabar. A Tragedy, in Three Acts. As It is Performed at the Theatre-Royal, Covent-Garden. London: William Lane, 1791. (adaptation of La Veuve de Malabar by Antoine-Marin Lemierre; produced in London in 1790; Lane published three editions and there was at least one further edition.)
- The Tournament. A Tragedy. Imitated from the celebrated German drama entitled Agnes Bernauer, which was written by a nobleman of high rank, and founded on a fact, that occurred in Bavaria about the year M,CCCC,CCCV. London: R. Phillips, 1801. (produced in 1800, published anonymously)

=== Poetry ===
- The Poor Soldier; an American Tale: Founded on a Recent Fact. Inscribed to Mrs Crespigny. London: J. Walter, 1789. (two editions)
- The Beauties of Carlo Maria Maggi, paraphrased: to which are added Sonnets, by Mariana Starke. Exeter: Printed for the author, by S. Woolmer ... and sold by Longman, Hurst, Rees, and Orme, London; by Upham, and also by Barratt, Bath, 1811. (Etext, Internet Archive)

=== Travel writing ===
- Letters from Italy, Between the Years 1792 and 1798, Containing a View of the Revolutions in that Country, from the Capture of Nice by the French Republic to the Expulsion of Pius VI from the Ecclesiastical State; likewise pointing out the matchless Works of Art which still embellish Pisa, Florence, Siena, Rome, Naples, Bologna, Venice, &c. With Instructions for the Use of Invalids and Families who may not choose to incur the Expence attendant upon travelling with a Courier. By Mariana Starke, Author of the Widow of Malabar, the Tournament, &c. In Two Volumes. 2 vols. London: R. Phillips, 1800. (Reprinted with a supplement as Travels in Italy, Between the Years 1792 and 1798, London: R. Phillips, 1802. 2nd ed. publ. by G. and S. Robinson, 1815; 3rd ed. publ. by Sherwood, Neely, and Jones, 1816. Etext, HathiTrust.)
- Travels on the Continent: Written for the Use and Particular Information of Travellers. By Mariana Starke. London: John Murray, 1820. (9 editions. From 1824, published as Information and Directions for Travellers on the Continent. Expanded to 658 pages and republished as Travels in Europe for the use of Travellers on the Continent and likewise in the Island of Sicily, to which is added an account of the Remains of Ancient Italy in 1832. Etext, Google)
- Travels in Europe between the Years 1824 and 1828 Adapted to the Use of Travellers Comprising an Historical Account of Sicily with Particular Information for Strangers in that Island By Mariana Starke. London: John Murray, 1828. (Etext, Internet Archive)

== See also ==
- Guide book
- Travel literature
- Women and the Grand Tour
