= The Sword of Peace =

1788 play

- Original language: English
- Written by: Mariana Starke
- Genre: Comedy
- Setting: British India, present day

Premiere
- Date: 9 August 1788
- Place: Theatre Royal, Haymarket, London

The Sword of Peace is a 1788 comedy play by the British writer Mariana Starke. It premiered at the Theatre Royal, Haymarket in London on 9 August 1788. The original London cast included Robert Baddeley as the Resident, Stephen Kemble as David Northcote, James Brown Williamson as Mr Edwards, John Palmer as Lieutenant Dormer, Robert Palmer as Supple, John Bannister as Jeffreys, William Chapman as Mazinghi Dowza, Elizabeth Farren as Miss Eliza Moreton, Elizabeth Kemble as Miss Louisa Moreton, Mary Whitfield as Mrs Tartar and Elizabeth Edwin as Mrs Gobble. Like her later play The Widow of Malabar (1790) it capitalised on Starke's own knowledge of India.

== Synopsis ==
Two sisters Eliza and Louisa Moreton travel out to British India in search of husbands.

== Bibliography ==
- Greene, John C. Theatre in Dublin, 1745-1820: A Calendar of Performances, Volume 6. Lexington Books, 2011.
- Nicoll, Allardyce. A History of English Drama 1660–1900: Volume IV. Cambridge University Press, 2009.
- Burroughs, Catherine. Women in British Romantic Theatre: Drama, Performance, and Society, 1790-1840. Cambridge University Press, 2000.
