= George Benson (theologian) =

British theologian

George Benson (1 September 1699 Great Salkeld – 6 April 1762 London) was an English Presbyterian pastor and theologian who was noted for his publications on the Christian epistles.

Benson often conversed with dignitaries such as Lord Chancellor Peter King and Edmund Law, the bishop of Carlisle. According to Alexander Balloch Grosart, writing in the Dictionary of National Biography, Benson's views were "Socinian" though at this period the term is often confused with Arian.

== Life ==
Benson was born at Great Salkeld, Cumberland, on 1 September 1699. His grandfather, also George Benson, served with the Roundheads during the English Civil War. Benson received a classical education and attended an academy run by Thomas Dixon at Whitehaven for one year. Benson then went to the University of Glasgow.

Around 1721, Benson moved to London. After being approved by several Presbyterian ministers, Benson began preaching, first at Chertsey and then in London. Edmund Calamy let Benson live with his own family. With Calamy's recommendation, Benson moved to Abingdon in Berkshire to be the pastor of a congregation of Protestant dissenters. On 27 March 1723, Calamy and five other ministers officiated at Benson's ordination. He continued in Abingdon for seven years. When ordained, Benson held strictly Calvinist opinions and preached them fervently.

In 1726 Benson married Elizabeth Hills. In 1729 he left Abingdon and moved back to London; his congregation had grown dissatisfied with Benson's increasingly Arminian views. Benson was considering giving up the ministry for a medical career when he received an invitation to become the pastor of a congregation in King John's Court, in the Southwark borough of London. Benson remained in Southwark for 11 years.

In 1740, Benson's wife Elizabeth died. In 1742, he married Mary Kettle, the daughter of William Kettle of Birmingham. Benson never had any children.

Around 1742, Benson became joint pastor with Samuel Bourn of the Presbyterian congregation in Birmingham. In 1744, the University of Aberdeen conferred a Doctorate of Divinity on Benson. The University of Glasgow had planned to confer the same honor, but one professor derailed it, calling Benson an avowed Socinian (Biog. Britannica).

In 1749, Benson took over the congregation of Protestant dissenters on Poor Jewry Lane in what is now Central London. This was his last posting. He had acted for some years as assistant to Dr. Nathaniel Lardner. After a short retirement, Benson died on 6 April 1762 at age 63.

== Works ==
While at Abingdon, Benson published three Practical Discourses that were written for 'young persons.' When his views changed later in life, he suppressed these discourses.

=== Paraphrases ===
- 1731 A Paraphrase and Notes on St. Paul's Epistle to Philemon. Attempted in imitation of Mr. Locke's manner. With an Appendix in which is shewn that St. Paul could neither be an enthusiast nor an impostor; and consequently the Christian religion must be (as he has represented it) heavenly and divine. The appendix referenced George Lyttelton's more famous treatise on St. Paul.
- 1731 Paraphrase and Notes on Paul's First Epistle to the Thessalonians.
- 1732 Paraphrase' on the Second Epistle to the Thessalonians. This work included two dissertations: Concerning the Kingdom of God, and Concerning the Man of Sin.
- 1733 '‘First Epistle to Timothy',’ with an appendix on inspiration.
- 1733 '‘Paraphrase and Notes upon Titus,'’ accompanied with an essay concerning the abolition of the ceremonial law.
- 1734 ‘'Second Epistle to Timothy,'’ with an essay in two parts: Concerning the Settlement of the Primitive Church and Concerning the Religious Worship of the Christians whilst the Spiritual Gifts continued.

Having completed his plan of paraphrases and notes on these epistles of St. Paul, he proceeded similarly to explain the Seven Catholic Epistles. These were successively published separately between 1738 and 1749, all having extended dissertations on particular points. Benson collected the Pauline Epistles into one volume in 1752, and in 1756 the Seven Catholic Epistles.

=== Other works ===
During the nineteen years occupied by these 'Paraphrases' Benson prepared and published a number of other works.

- 1738 History of the First Planting of the Christian Religion, taken from the Acts of the Apostles and their Epistles. Together with the remarkable facts of the Jewish and Roman History which affected the Christians during this Period (3 vols.). A second edition was printed in 1756. Later writers are indebted to it. His 'Paraphrases' found favour in Germany, where Michaelis translated them, and in Holland.
- 1743 The Reasonableness of the Christian Religion as delivered in the Scriptures. This was originally meant as an answer to Henry Dodwell's Christianity not founded on Argument, but its scope widened, and John Leland in his 'View of the Deistical Writers' (i. 146, 5th ed.) characterises it as 'not merely an answer to that pamphlet, but a good defence of Christianity in general.' A second edition appeared in 1746, and a third edition, much enlarged, in 1759.
- 1744 A Summary View of the Evidences of Christ's Resurrection, in answer to The Resurrection of Jesus considered by a Moral Philosopher. Besides editing two works of others he, in 1747, published a volume of sermons.

1748 Occasional Tracts, a collection of theologico-critical and historical tracts. They reached a second edition in 1753. One of these tracts, giving a severe account of John Calvin's conduct towards Servetus, gave considerable offence.

- 1764 History of the Life of Christ published posthumously. His fellow dissenter Hugh Farmer disagreed with Benson's defence of the Temptations of Christ as the work of a literal devil.

== Notes and references ==
=== Sources ===
- Grosart, Alexander Balloch (1885). "Benson, George" . In Stephen, Leslie (ed.). Dictionary of National Biography. Vol. 4. London: Smith, Elder & Co.
