= Woolley Green, Berkshire =

Village in Berkshire, England

Coordinates: 51.510°N 0.770°W

Woolley Green
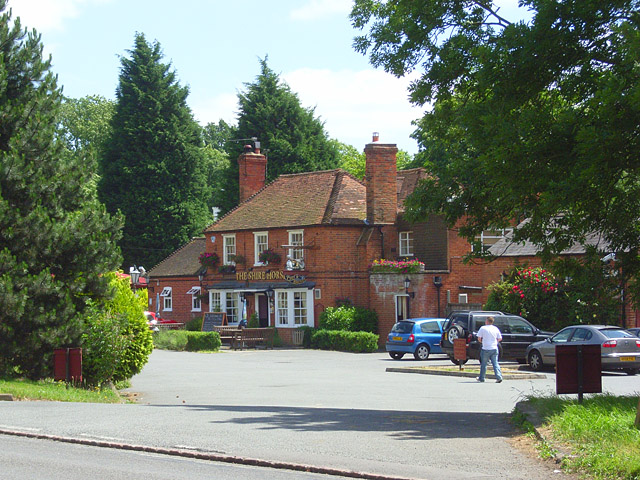
- The Shire Horse

- Location within Berkshire
- OS grid reference: SU8580
- Civil parish: White Waltham
- Unitary authority: Windsor and Maidenhead
- Ceremonial county: Berkshire
- Region: South East
- Country: England
- Sovereign state: United Kingdom
- Police: Thames Valley
- Fire: Royal Berkshire
- Ambulance: South Central

Woolley Green is a village to the west of Maidenhead in the county of Berkshire, England.

== Location ==
Woolley Green is a ribbon development along Cherry Garden Lane in the extreme north-east corner of the civil parish of White Waltham in Berkshire. It sits just south of the Bath Road, immediately to the west of Junction 9b of the A404(M) and east of Littlewick Green. It is surrounded, on the north and west, by Maidenhead Thicket. The hamlet of Altwood adjoins it to the south.

== Buildings ==
Interesting buildings in Woolley include Feens Farm, Woolley Hall and Woolley Grange. Feens Farm is the old manor house of Woolley Fiennes. It is said to be haunted by a Roman hunting dog, the 'Black Dog of Feens'. Woolley Hall became the manor house when it was built in the 1780s.
