= Women and the Grand Tour =

The Grand Tour of Europe became increasingly popular among women in the late 18th century and early 19th century. For British upper-class young women travelling Europe was part of formal education as well as a form of entrance into elite society. When published, women’s letters and travel diaries about their experiences provided entertainment and vicarious travel for a less elite audience.

== History ==
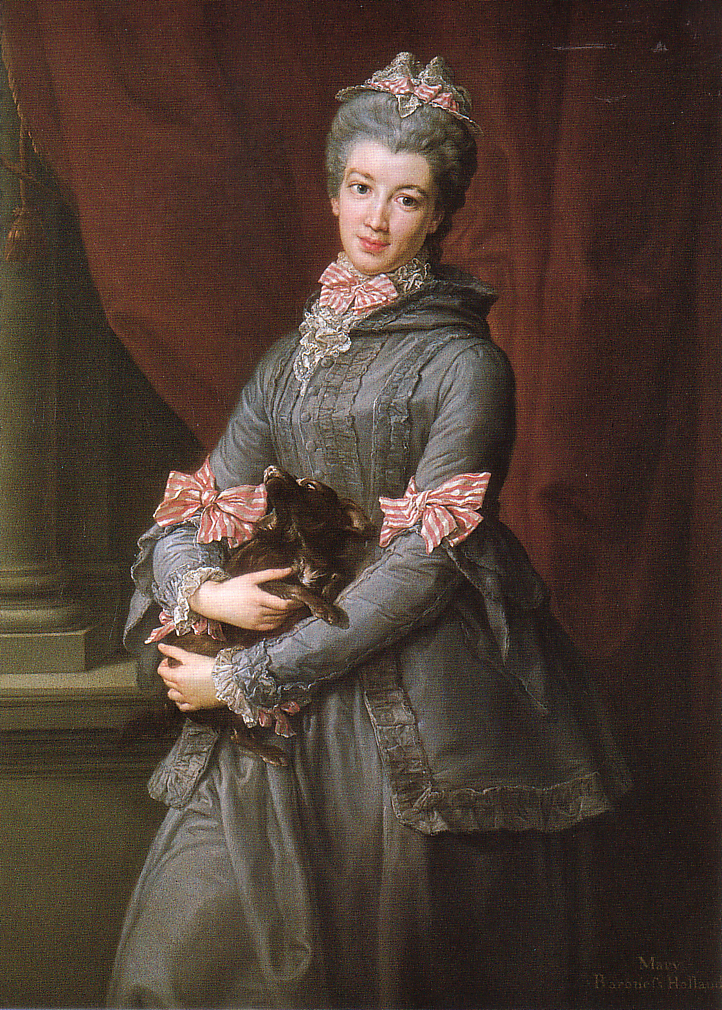
Lady Mary Fox painted by Pompeo Batoni

The Grand Tour was a voyage for education and pleasure for wealthy young men that mainly occurred between the years 1550 and 1850. The Grand Tour was mainly a British cultural phenomenon and focused mostly on the art and culture of Italy. Most travel was between major cities within Western Europe such as Paris and Rome, and hardly any to Eastern Europe.

The typical traveler on the Grand Tour was a gentleman of the wealthy and elite class. Even though the Grand Tour was designed for gentlemen, female spouses or family members of Grand Tourists would accompany them. These instances were not common as men typically embarked on the Grand Tour around the age of 17 before marriage. Women rarely traveled alone, so any experience on the Grand Tour was to accompany a husband or relative.

Women without wealth or means of marrying into it had very limited options for travel. Outside of the standard tour, the only other viable options for women to travel were either by eloping with a lover in another country or arranging employment as a governess with a traveling family. Around the mid 18th century there began to be more talk from high-society women intellectuals, or “blue-stockings”, about woman’s right to her own interests and voice. This movement paved the way for some women of influence to be able to travel Europe without the presence of a man. Additionally, towards the end of the 18th century the costs of travel decreased and new modes of reliable transportation became increasingly accessible which facilitated travel for middle-class women.

== Published accounts ==
Women on the Grand Tour often wrote detailed letters home to their friends and family to describe their experiences. Occasionally the letters would be published as a sort of early women’s guide to travel in Europe. Chief among these being Lady Anna Miller’s Letters from Italy published in 1776 which detailed her tour of Italian arts with her husband. During her travels from 1770 to 1771 in Italy, Miller wrote letters to a friend in France describing her interactions with and views on the culture and customs. Miller also offered recommendations and critiques of the art scene in Italy. Miller’s book was published as a guide other Grand Tourists on what to expect about Italian culture and which sights and art to seek out during their travels.

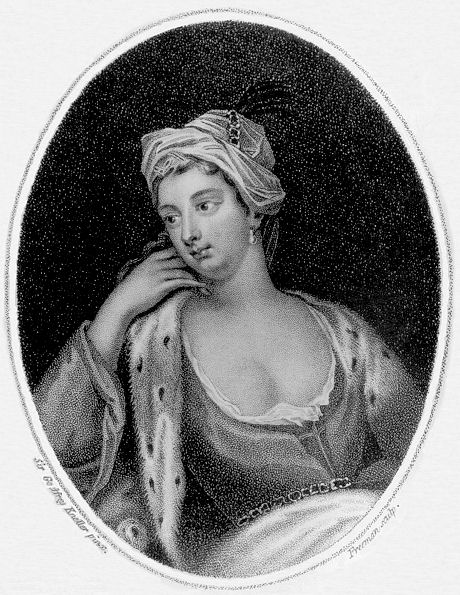
Lady Mary Wortley Montagu

Lady Mary Wortley Montagu travelled to Italy three different times during her life. Montagu did not originally intend for her letters from Italy to be published. Her letters from her tours of Italy were published at different times over a period of 150 years. Montagu’s letters were mainly described her sightseeing, the current events on Italy, and her personal thoughts and views. Montagu’s motivation to travel to Italy was her fascination with an Italian poet half her age named Francesco Algarotti. Scholars also suspect her sudden uproot to Italy was a form of feminist protest to break away from societal expectations of being an upper-class housewife and mother. It appeared that Algarotti did not return her affection and stood her up on her first voyage to Venice to meet him, and the two eventually reunited in Turin on a second visit but it was not the romantic encounter Montagu imagined it would be. Despite these setbacks, Montagu was content because she felt the beauty of Italy had “wooed” her instead. After Montagu’s decision to move permanently to Italy in 1742 she was forced to flee to France for a period of four years to escape political turmoil. Montagu returned to settle in the province of Brescia near Lake Iseo in Northern Italy in 1746, and in 1756 made her final move to live in Venice where she remained until her death in 1762.

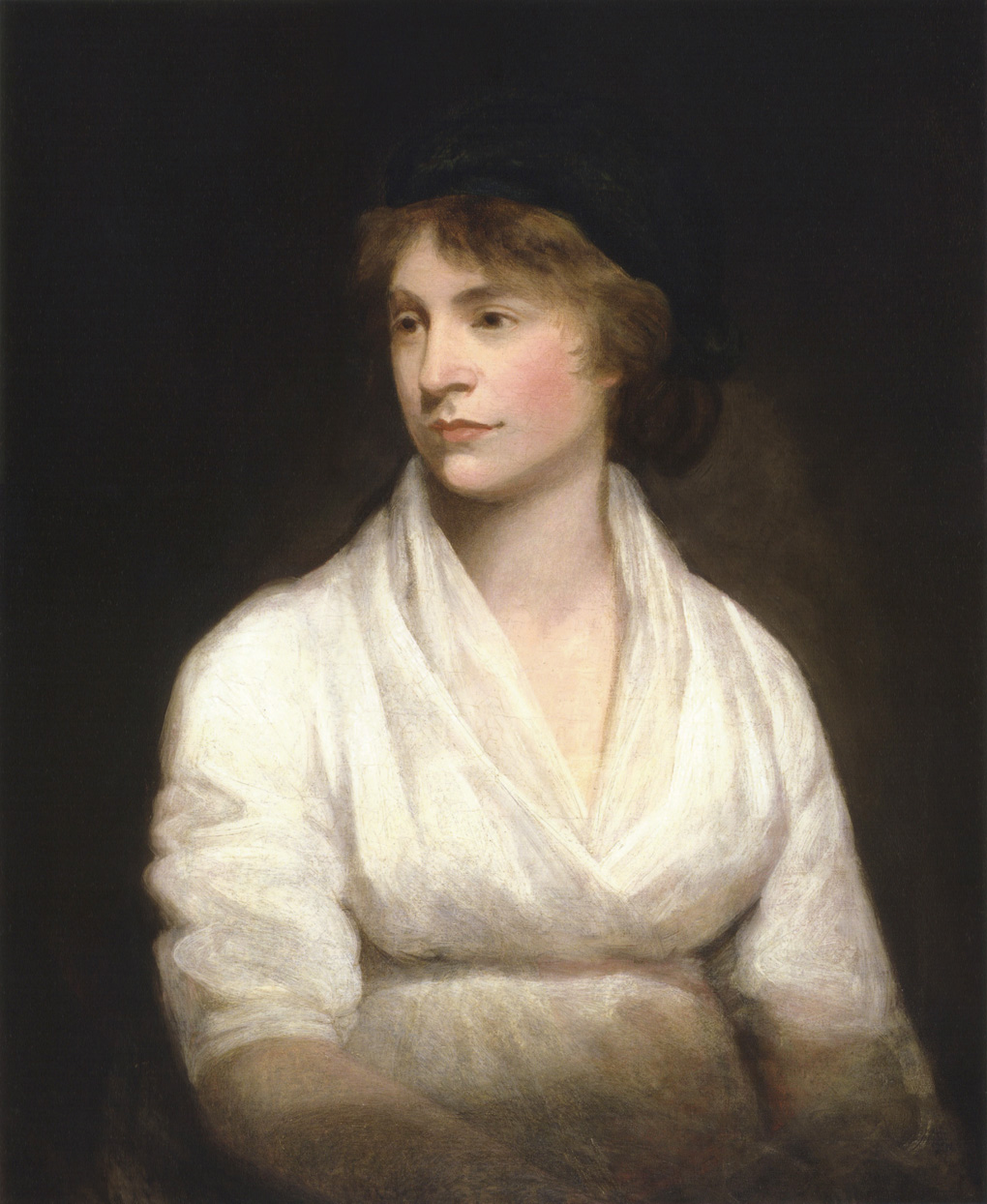
Mary Wollstonecraft by John Opie (c. 1797)

Mary Wollstonecraft was from a somewhat wealthy middle-class family which allowed her to travel Europe as part of her education. Wollstonecraft appeared particularly interested in visiting France and Italy because of the tales of the liberated women there. She wrote in her A Vindication of the Rights of Woman (1792) that women in France and Italy have not “confined themselves to domestic life” and declared that she must “[…] certainly visit France.” After A Vindication of the Rights of Woman was published her heartbreak over artist Henry Fuseli prompted her sudden flight to France and tour across Europe to regain her independence. Wollstonecraft used her time in Paris to further her education as well as become involved in local politics by writing a proposal for a French Committee to improve women’s education.

Lady Elizabeth Holland was a British heiress of a Jamaican plantation owner whose wealth afforded her the ability to travel Europe at will. During a 1788 visit to Italy Lady Holland studied the Italian poets, antiquities, language and even attend lectures on chemistry. To remember her time in Italy, Lady Holland commissioned a portrait of herself atop Mount Vesuvius by the artist Ann Flaxman. In 1791 Lady Holland began a formal Grand Tour of Europe while married to her first husband, Sir Godfrey Webster. While on the Grand Tour she met and had an affair with Lord Holland, which caused her infamous divorce of Sir Webster and remarriage to Lord Holland throwing. Lady Holland’s scandal ostracized her from her normal high-society social circles and turned her into a major topic of gossip. It was not uncommon for high-status Grand Tourists to engage or be rumored to engage in extra-marital affairs during their travels in Europe. Whole magazines were dedicated to detailing the gossip around the affairs of the elites in the area, such as the Female Tattler in 1709.

Mariana Starke wrote her own Letters from Italy which were formally published in 1800. Starke, a 31-year-old playwright from London, embarked on her journey to Europe to accompany a sick relative to the Italian seaside in hopes of fresh air for recovery. Starke's travels in Italy lasted from 1792 to 1798. Among documentation of her sightseeing, her letters also detailed the political turmoil and specific battles between Italy and France and included copies of the correspondence between Napoleon Bonaparte and Pope Pius VI during the 1796 invasion of the Papal States. Starke later took much of the content from her Letters from Italy and published it as a formal travel guide called Travels on the Contient: Written for the Use and Particular Information of Travellers. Starke’s guide included her experiences as well as packing lists and other practical aids as a guide for those who might travel under the same circumstances as she.

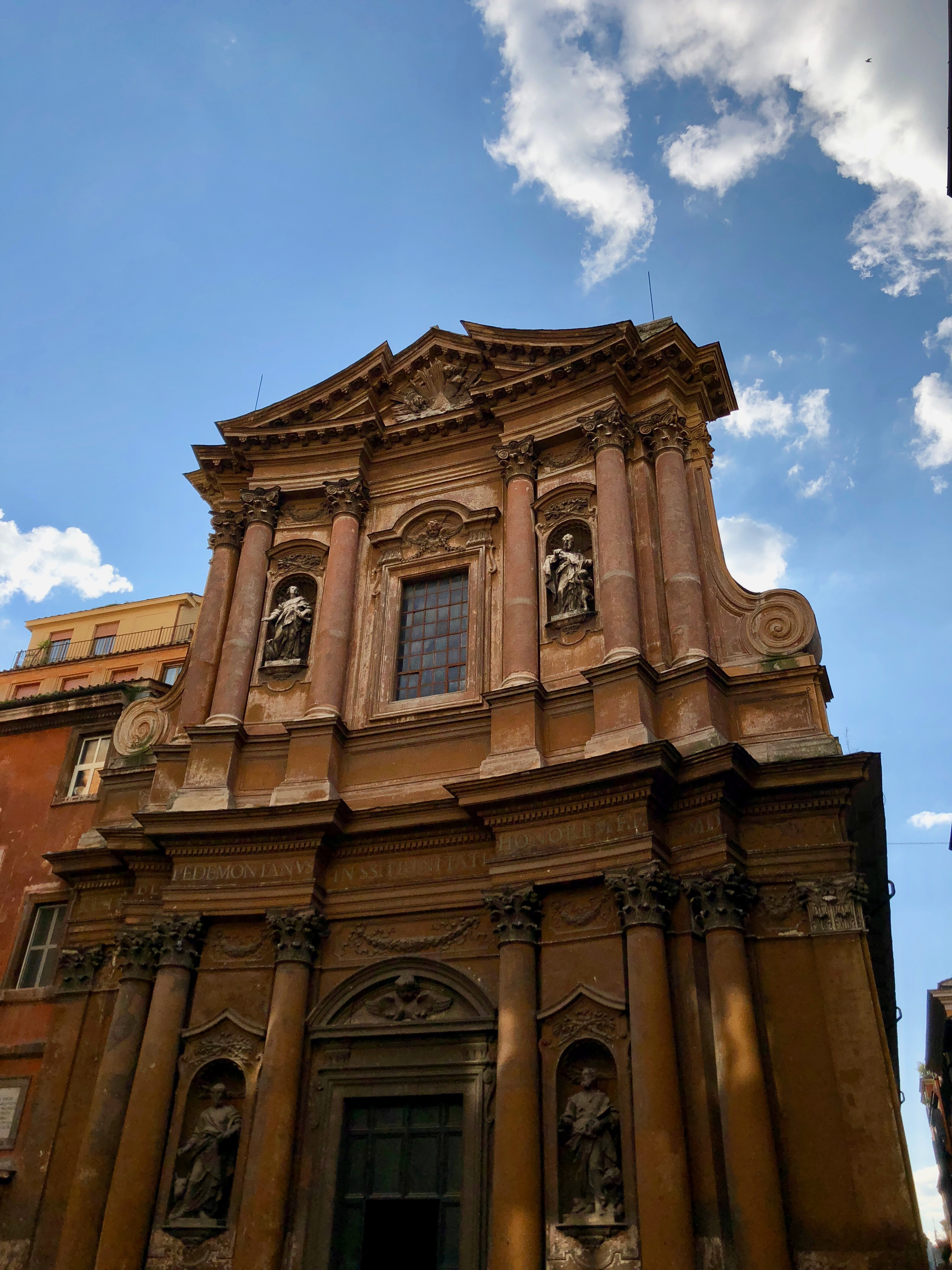
Santissima Trinità dei Pellegrini in Rome

Louisa Augusta Webb traveled extensively across Western Europe at age 17 along with her younger sisters because of her father’s work, which was not specified. Webb documented her visit to Europe extensively through her letters and detailed sketches which revealed experiences unique to women in Europe. During one such experience, Webb and her sisters participated in a “foot washing ceremony exclusively for women at Trinità dei Pelligrini in Rome during 1864. Webb’s letters were not published during her lifetime.

== Cultural reactions ==
Many women were attracted to travel in Italy in the 18th century because of the Gothic novels depicting brooding Italian heroes such as Anne Radcliffe's The Italian or The Mysteries of Udolpho. Radcliffe and her husband never actually toured Italy due to faulty passports, so none of her stories were based on real experiences. Inspired by her dramatic stories, the more affluent of Radcliffe’s readers based some of their travel plans to include towns that fit the Gothic mystique and attempt to pursue mystery and drama.

Countess Marguerite of Blessington also wrote dramas based on her travels throughout Italy published as The Idler in Italy in 1839. Blessington’s novel featured accounts of exciting adventures on the Italian seaside and rendezvous with dark and secretive Lords. Similar to Radcliffe, Blessington popularized the Grand Tour and influenced her readers to travel to Italy not just for education, but for personal adventure.
