= Shottesbrooke =

Coordinates: 51°29′10″N 0°47′17″W

- Hamlet and civil parish
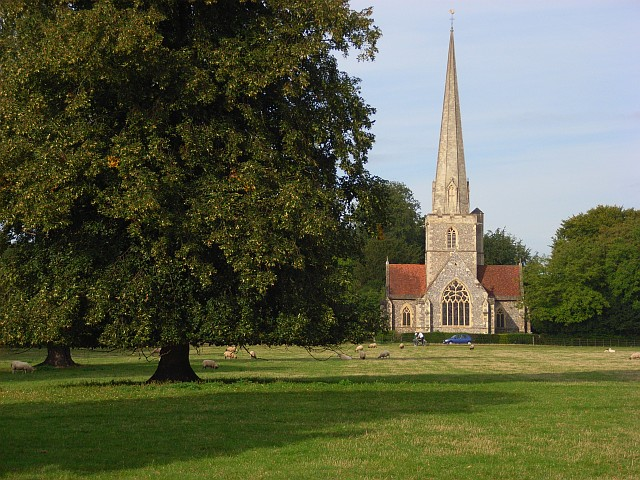
- St John the Baptist Church at Shottesbrooke Park

- Location within Berkshire
- Area: 5.64 km^{2} (2.18 sq mi)
- Population: 141 (2011 Civil Parish)
  - Density: 25/km^{2} (65/sq mi)
- OS grid reference: SU8477
  - London: 28.9 miles (46.5 km)
- Civil parish: Shottesbrooke
- Unitary authority: Windsor and Maidenhead
- Ceremonial county: Berkshire
- Region: South East
- Country: England
- Sovereign state: United Kingdom
- Post town: MAIDENHEAD
- Postcode district: SL6
- Dialling code: 01628
- Police: Thames Valley
- Fire: Royal Berkshire
- Ambulance: South Central
- UK Parliament: Maidenhead

Shottesbrooke /ʃɒts.brʊk/ is a hamlet and civil parish administered by the unitary authority of the Royal Borough of Windsor and Maidenhead in the English county of Berkshire. The hamlet is mostly rural: 88% covered by agriculture or woodland and had a population of 141 at the 2011 census.

== Demography and land use ==
The parish saw an 8% decrease in population between 2001 and 2011 according to the UK census, from 154 in 2001 to 141 in 2011. This contrasts to an increase in the borough as a whole. The parish had 61 dwellings (i.e. homes) in 2011. The majority (4.972 km^{2} (1.920 sq mi)) of land is defined as agricultural or other greenspace, in the land use statistics of January 2005 and 0.149 km^{2} (0.058 sq mi) 14.9 hectares (37 acres) fell within either road or rail use. Gardens accounted for 0.054 square kilometres (0.021 sq mi) and water 0.027 km^{2} (0.010 sq mi) all of which was in tributaries or ponds rather than lakes or rivers. The remaining three categories were in decreasing overall size: other land use, non-domestic buildings and domestic buildings.

== Geography ==
Shottesbrooke is a parish between Waltham St Lawrence on the west and White Waltham on the east. They were originally one place, Waltham, which was divided in the Saxon era. Today, as always, it is mostly farmland with some large areas of woodland in between, particularly the Great Wood. The hamlet of Cold Harbour is in the very north of the parish, with Shottesbrooke itself in the central area, between Shottesbrooke Park and Smewins' Farm, where the B3024 runs through the region. The M4 motorway crosses the south-east corner of the parish.

== History ==
The Roman 'Camlet Way' between St Albans and Silchester would have crossed the parish at some point and the name 'Cold Harbour' indicates there was an inn or other stopping place nearby. In Saxon times, the manor was owned by the Royal goldsmiths and 'Alward the Goldsmith' was one of the few Saxons allowed to keep his manor here after the Norman Conquest. It is said that charcoal from the Great Wood which occupies most of the southern third of Shottesbrooke was used to melt the gold to make the Saxon Royal regalia.

Shottesbrooke was created a parish, endowed with its own church and priest mainly because of national wealth and later accomplishments of successive owners of Shottesbrooke Park. It was the home of Sir William Trussell, a prominent Royal diplomat in the mid-14th century. He built the Decorated Period parish church as an ecclesiastical college in 1337. The church is renowned for its fine memorial brasses and Trussell's beautifully carved double-recessed monument.

Towards the end of the reign of Edward III the church and college were almost destroyed by fire, but from the design of the existing church the damage done must have been almost entirely confined to the secular buildings. The building is remarkable both for its beauty and symmetry of design and its present good state of preservation. It is recorded that on Wednesday, 20 July 1757, a violent thunderstorm passed over Shottesbrook (a variant spelling until the 1930s), and the church was so damaged by the lightning that it had to be shut up for more than a year, during which time the parishioners attended White Waltham. It re-opened on Sunday, 24 September 1758, after repairs. The chief damage appears to have been done to the spire, which was so shaken that it was at first thought that it would have to be taken down. A gallery across the north transept (evidently an 18th-century addition, removed in 1854) was also damaged and so too the north porch. The falling stones from the spire slightly damaged the roof setting a few rafters on fire. In 1852–4 the church was thoroughly restored under the supervision of G. E. Street, R. A. Between 1870 and 1872 the village real property of £2,134 (equivalent to £257,911 in 2023) had 148 residents spread over 23 homes, fewer than 50% of the current number. Most adult residents in the 1871 census were employees at the few large houses and their associated farms.

A 17th century Speaker of the House of Commons, Henry Powle, lived at the Park. He was followed by Francis Cherry, the non-juror (unwilling to override his oath of recognition of the legal right to reign of the deposed Catholic monarch, James II of England) and guardian of Thomas Hearne and patron of Francis Brokesby. His friend, Henry Dodwell, the theologian, lived at Smewins. Later, Governor Henry Vansittart was in residence and his brother, Professor Robert Vansittart also grew up there. Until his death in 2007, the Park was the home of their heir and relation-by-marriage, Sir John Smith, the founder of the Landmark Trust, which has its headquarters in the adjoining farmhouse.

== Legacies ==
Shottesbrooke has an eponym as name of an Australian vineyard in the McLaren Vale wine region, named after the church where the owner's grandfather was vicar.
