= William Dodwell =

English cleric and theological writer

William Dodwell (1709–1785) was an English cleric known as a theological writer, archdeacon of Berkshire from 1763.

== Life ==
He was born at Shottesbrooke, Berkshire, on 17 June 1709, was the second son and fifth child of Henry Dodwell the elder, the nonjuror. He was educated at Trinity College, Oxford, where he took his degree of M.A. in 1732.

Dodwell became rector of Shottesbrooke, and vicar of White Waltham and Bucklesbury. Thomas Sherlock as bishop of Salisbury gave him a prebendal stall in Salisbury Cathedral in 1748; and he later obtained a residentiary canonry there. Subsequently, another bishop of Salisbury, John Thomas, made him archdeacon of Berkshire, in 1763.

On 23 February 1750 the university of Oxford conferred on Dodwell the degree of D.D. by diploma, in recognition of his services to religion by his replies to Conyers Middleton (see Middletonian Controversy).

Dodwell died on 23 October 1785.

== Works ==
Dodwell, like his father, was a keen controversialist: his opponents included Conyers Middleton, William Romaine, William Whiston, and others. His works include:

- ‘Two Sermons on the Eternity of Future Punishment,’ in answer to William Whiston, Oxford, 1743.
- ‘A Visitation Sermon on the desirableness of the Christian Faith,’ published at the request of Bishop Sherlock, Oxford, 1744.
- ‘Two Sermons on 1 Pet. iii. 15 on the Nature, Procedure, and Effects of a Rational Faith, preached before the University of Oxford, 11 March and 24 June 1744,’ published at Oxford 1745; these were written specially in answer to his brother Henry Dodwell's Christianity not founded on Argument.
- ‘Sermon on the Practical Influence of the Doctrine of the Holy Trinity,’ Oxford, 1745.
- ‘Dissertation on Jephthah's Vow, occasioned by Rev. William Romaine's Sermon on the subject,’ London, 1745.
- ‘Practical Discourses (14) on Moral Subjects,’ vol. i. London, 1748, dedicated to his patron, Arthur Vansittart, esq., of Shottesbrooke; vol. ii. 1749, dedicated to Bishop Sherlock.
- ‘Free Answer to Dr. Middleton's Free Inquiry into the Miraculous Powers of the Primitive Church,’ London, 1749.
- ‘Assize Sermon on Human Laws,’ Oxford, 1750.
- ‘Reply to Mr. Toll's Defence of Dr. Middleton's Free Inquiry,’ London, 1751.
- ‘Sermon on St. Paul's wish,’ Oxford, 1752.
- ‘Two Sermons on Superstition,’ Oxford, 1754.
- ‘Letter to the Author of Considerations on the Act to prevent Clandestine Marriages,’ with a postscript occasioned by Henry Stebbing's ‘Enquiry into the Annulling Clauses in London,’ 1755, by a country clergyman.
- ‘Two Sermons on the Doctrine of Divine Visitation by Earthquakes,’ Oxford, 1756.
- ‘Assize Sermon on the equal and impartial discharge of Justice,’ Oxford, 1756.
- ‘Assize Sermon on the False Witness,’ oxford, 1758.
- ‘Sermon at the Meeting of the Charity Schools,’ London, 1758.
- ‘Two Sermons on a Particular Providence,’ Oxford, 1760.
- ‘Sermon before the Sons of the Clergy,’ London, 1760.
- ‘Charge to the Clergy of the Archdeaconry of Berks,’ London, 1764.
- ‘Sermon at the Consecration of Bishop Moss (St. David's) in 1766,’ London, 1767.
- ‘The Sick Man's Companion; or the Clergyman's Assistant in Visiting the Sick, with a Dissertation on Prayer,’ London, 1767.
- ‘Prayer on Laying the Foundation Stone of Salisbury Infirmary,’ subjoined to Dean Graves's Infirmary Sermon,’ Salisbury, 1767.
- ‘Infirmary Sermon,’ Salisbury, 1768.
- ‘Three Charges on the Athanasian Creed,’ Oxford University Press, 1802, published by Dodwell's eldest son, the Rev. Henry Dodwell, rector of Harlaxton and Colsterworth in Lincolnshire, at the request of some Oxford friends.

== Family ==
On 27 November 1740 Dodwell was married at Bray Church to Elizabeth Brown, by whom he had a large family, one of whom married Thomas Ridding, a relation of George Ridding. He was the brother of religious controversialist and lawyer Henry Dodwell jr, who wrote the well known tract Christianity Not Founded on Argument (1741).
