= Paley Street =

Coordinates: 51°28′41″N 0°44′56″W

- Village
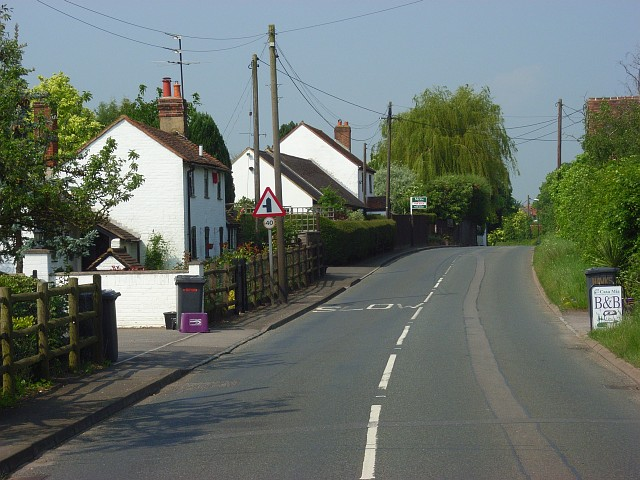

- Location within Berkshire
- Population: <100
- OS grid reference: SU871764
- Civil parish: White Waltham/Bray
- Unitary authority: Windsor and Maidenhead
- Ceremonial county: Berkshire
- Region: South East
- Country: England
- Sovereign state: United Kingdom
- Post town: MAIDENHEAD
- Postcode district: SL6
- Dialling code: 01628
- Police: Thames Valley
- Fire: Royal Berkshire
- Ambulance: South Central
- UK Parliament: Maidenhead

Paley Street is a small village in the civil parishes of White Waltham and Bray, in the Windsor and Maidenhead district, in the ceremonial county of Berkshire. It is situated about 4 miles (6.4 km) south of Maidenhead and 6 miles (9.7 km) west of Windsor. By the later medieval period, 'street' was often used to describe straggling villages in areas of late woodland clearance. Paley Street is one such example.

== Amenities ==
Paley Street had two pubs; The Bridge House and The Royal Oak, the latter being a Michelin starred gastro pub formerly owned by TV personality Michael Parkinson. The pub closed during the COVID-19 pandemic and was subsequently demolished. A new restaurant is due to be erected on the site.
