= Shottesbrooke Park =

Country house in Berkshire, England

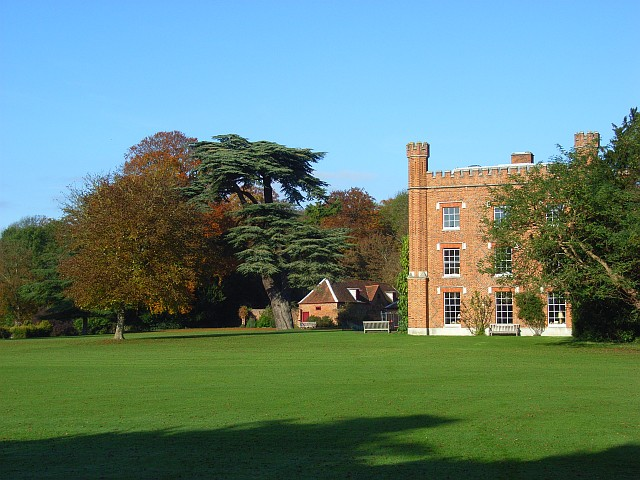
- Shottesbrooke Park house

- Location within Berkshire

General information
- Location: Shottesbrooke, Berkshire, England
- Coordinates: 51°29′16″N 0°47′26″W
- Year built: 16th century

Listed Building – Grade II*
- Official name: Shottesbrooke Park
- Designated: 11 April 1972
- Reference no.: 1117448

Shottesbrooke Park is a Grade II* listed country house and park in Shottesbrooke, Berkshire, England, southwest of Maidenhead. The house is a Tudor mansion, built in the 16th century. St John the Baptist Church lies next to the grounds of Shottesbrooke Park House and dates back to the 14th century where it was established as a religious house, college, and chantry by Sir William Trussell.

== History ==
A 17th-century Speaker of the House of Commons, Henry Powle, lived at the Park.

In the 18th and early 19th century, the estate was owned by the Vansittart family and was the seat of Arthur Vansittart, one of the verderers of Windsor Forest. Vansittart was reported to have been 79 years of age upon his death in 1804, and his son and grandson shared the same name. In 1858 it was known to have been occupied by Francis Cherry, guardian of Thomas Hearne, who owned the house for well over 40 years. In 1874 it was reported that house was often repaired by a Robert Nelson.

Until his death in 2007, the Park was the home of their heir and relation-by-marriage, Sir John Smith, the founder of the Landmark Trust which has its headquarters in the adjoining farmhouse.

In 1964 the famous "Great Steam Fair" was held for three days at Shottesbrooke Park. This is widely considered to be the forerunner of today's steam and vintage rallies in England, such as the Great Dorset Steam Fair.

== See also ==
- Grade II* listed buildings in Berkshire
