= Francis Cherry (non-juror) =

English layman

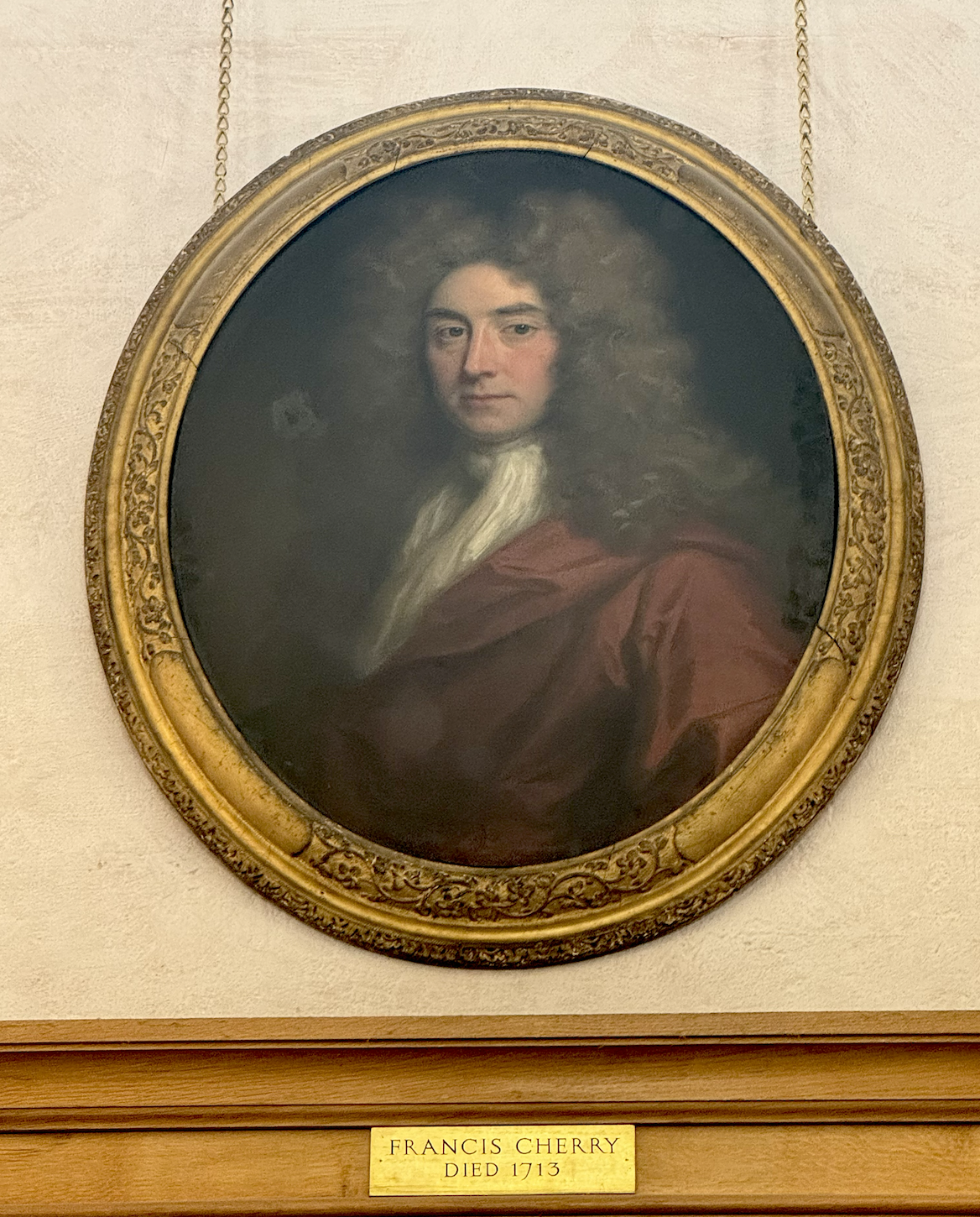
Portrait of Cherry gifted by his daughter in 1729 to the Bodleian Library, where it hangs in the lower reading room

Francis Cherry (1665 – 23 September 1713) was an English layman and non-juror, known as a philanthropist and benefactor.

== Life ==
The son of William and Anne Cherry of Shottesbrooke in Berkshire, he was born in Maidenhead in 1665, and was a gentleman commoner of St Edmund Hall, Oxford. Soon after age 20 he married Eliza, daughter of John Finch of Fiennes Court in the neighbouring parish of White Waltham. He and his wife lived with his father at Shottesbrooke. William Cherry survived until the Glorious Revolution; he allowed his son £2,500 a year to visit Bath and other places, and for charity. Among those he supported was Thomas Hearne, the antiquary, the son of the parish clerk of White Waltham. Cherry sent Hearne to school; and in 1695 took him to live in his house, helped him in his studies, and supplied him with money until he had taken his M.A. degree.

== Non-juror ==
Cherry would not acknowledge William III and Mary II. He became a liberal patron of some of the most eminent of the nonjuring party. At Shottesbrooke he often entertained Thomas Ken; Henry Dodwell he settled in a house near his own, and Robert Nelson was his constant guest. Charles Leslie he concealed for a while in a house belonging to him at White Waltham, and sent him to Rome to convert the old Chevalier de St. George. The prince assured Leslie of his attachment to his Catholic faith, and sent Cherry a ring as a token of his regard. First Gilbert and then Francis Brokesby held prayers twice daily at his house, acting as local chaplains. At the same time Cherry lived on good terms with White Kennet. His views on the duty of the non-jurors when the rights of the deprived bishops ceased to exist are found in letters of Brokesby, with whom he and Dodwell returned to the communion of the Church of England on 26 February 1710.

== Later life and death ==
On the death of his father Cherry took on his debts, amounting to £30,000. This brought him into serious difficulties. On one occasion he was arrested at the suit of Mrs. Barbara Porter, his godmother, for a debt of £200, and was for a few days in Reading gaol. He died on 23 September 1713 and was buried on the 25th. In accordance with his wishes his funeral was performed privately at 10 p.m. in Shottesbrooke churchyard, and on his tomb were inscribed only the words ‘Hic jacet peccatorum maximus,’ with the year of his death.

== Legacy ==
Thomas Cherry (1683–1706) was one of the recipients of his benefactions.

His manuscripts were given by his widow to the University of Oxford. Among them was a letter Hearne had written to him on the subject of the oath of allegiance, which fell into the hands of the antiquary's enemies, and caused him trouble. Shottesbrooke was sold in 1717.

== Family ==
Cherry had two sons, who died in infancy, and three daughters; the eldest, Anne, presented her father's picture to the University Gallery; the youngest, Eliza, married Henry Frinsham, vicar of White Waltham, and became the mother of Eliza Berkeley.
