= White Waltham =

Village in Berkshire, England

Coordinates: 51°29′24″N 0°46′08″W

- Village and civil parish
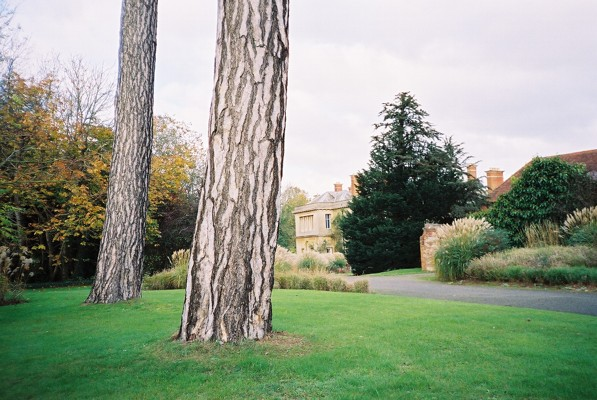
- Waltham Place

- Location within Berkshire
- Area: 10.44 km^{2} (4.03 sq mi)
- Population: 2,850 (2011.Civil Parish)
  - Density: 273/km^{2} (710/sq mi)
- OS grid reference: SU855775
- Civil parish: White Waltham
- Unitary authority: Windsor and Maidenhead
- Ceremonial county: Berkshire
- Region: South East
- Country: England
- Sovereign state: United Kingdom
- Post town: Maidenhead
- Postcode district: SL6
- Dialling code: 01628
- Police: Thames Valley
- Fire: Royal Berkshire
- Ambulance: South Central
- UK Parliament: Maidenhead

White Waltham is a village and civil parish, 3.5 miles (6 km) west of Maidenhead, in the Royal Borough of Windsor and Maidenhead in Berkshire, England. It is crossed briefly by the M4 motorway, which along with the Great Western Main Line and all other roads covers 0.267 square kilometres (0.103 sq mi) of the parish and 'greenspace' which includes cultivated fields covers the most part - this covered (in January 2005) 9.421 square kilometres (3.637 sq mi). White Waltham Airfield is in the parish.

== Extent ==
In the south, the parish includes the hamlets of Paley Street and Littlefield Green. White Waltham village is clustered and sits in the mid-west of the parish. To the northeast is Woodlands Park, on the edge of Maidenhead, and the Maidenhead Business Park. In the northeast corner of the parish is Woolley Green and in the northwest, most of Littlewick Green.

== History ==
The area was made up of a few manor houses, many of which evolved into country houses, for example Waltham Place, with its organic farm and gardens which are open to the public. The Church of England parish church of St Mary dates from Norman times, but has many fourteenth-century and Victorian features. Frequent disputes as to the boundary between White Waltham and Bray occurred at intervals since 1286 and Thomas Hearne, historian, gives an account of the beating of the bounds in his own life-time, mentioning all the place-names and commenting on 'the insolence of the parishioners of Bray in transgressing their bounds.'

Sir Constantine Henry Phipps, Lord Chancellor of Ireland, was buried at St. Mary in 1723. Thomas Hearne was born at Littlefield Green in 1678. Acquiring the patronage of the local lord of the manor, Francis Cherry, he rose to become assistant-keeper of the Bodleian Library in Oxford and the author of many important works. White Waltham School was established in 1828 and has been developed and expanded since, providing primary education for pupils between the ages of 5 and 11 and has legal academy status. The area had approximately half of the population in the late Victorian period but was overall significantly poorer in terms of real property.

Post town, Maidenhead. Acres, 2,576. Real property, £1580 (equivalent to £584,552 in 2025). Pop., 917. Houses, 179. The manor belongs to [Mr] Vansittart...W. Grove, W. Place, Heywood Lodge, and Woolley Lodge, are chief residences. Roman coins, tiles, and other relics have been found. The living is a vicarage, annexed to Shottesbrook. The church was restored in 1869. There are an Independent chapel and a national school.

— John Marius Wilson, Imperial Gazetteer, 1870-2

Today White Waltham has more than five times as many homes with 1,214. The area's agriculture was noted as of high fertility justifying its protection after World War II. After World War II the south of White Waltham was proposed as land for Berkshire's new town to rehouse Londoners made homeless by The Blitz. However, central and local government agreed in 1949 to use the alternative of Bracknell, as the White Waltham site would have encroached on good quality agricultural land, and was not on a railway.

== Carters Steam Fair ==
In 1964, the famous "Great Steam Fair" was held for three days at Shottesbrooke Park near White Waltham. This is widely considered to be the forerunner of today's steam and vintage rallies in England, such as the Great Dorset Steam Fair.

== Sources ==
- Ditchfield, P.H.; Page, W.H., eds. (1923). A History of the County of Berkshire, Volume 3. Victoria County History. pp. 171–177.
- Pevsner, Nikolaus (1966). Berkshire. The Buildings of England. Harmondsworth: Penguin Books. p. 265.
