= Littlewick Green =

Coordinates: 51°30′47″N 0°47′28″W

- Village
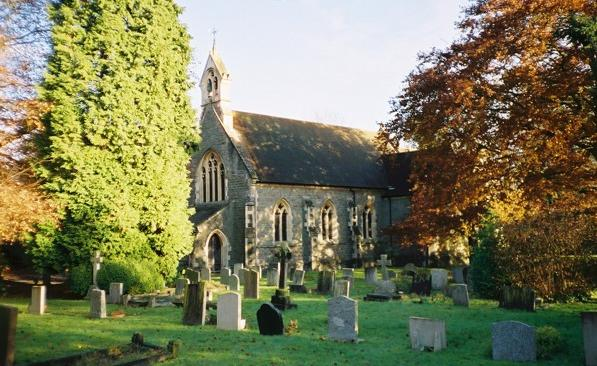
- St John the Evangelist parish church

- Location within Berkshire
- OS grid reference: SU838801
- Unitary authority: Windsor and Maidenhead
- Ceremonial county: Berkshire
- Region: South East
- Country: England
- Sovereign state: United Kingdom
- Post town: Maidenhead
- Postcode district: SL6
- Dialling code: 01628
- Police: Thames Valley
- Fire: Royal Berkshire
- Ambulance: South Central
- UK Parliament: Maidenhead

Littlewick Green is a village in the north of civil parish of White Waltham (where the 2011 Census was included) and the south of the civil parish of Hurley, near Maidenhead in Berkshire, England.

== Geography ==
The village is set around a village green, and includes the Church of England parish church of St John the Evangelist (built in 1893), The Cricketers public house, village hall and parish school (now a private dwelling). It also includes Redroofs, the house where Ivor Novello lived and where he composed many of his most famous works.

== History ==
The first known record of Littlewick is in a 940 AD charter by Edmund I when it was called Hildleage. Originally established as a small clearing in the Great Forest of Windsor, it was once a place where villagers eked out a living by labouring for local lords and grazing livestock in the forest.

Littlewick Green was formally established in 1894 as a separate civil parish from the larger parish of White Waltham. This change followed the Local Government Act 1894, which created the modern system of parish councils across England.

== In popular culture ==
The village, and surrounding areas, have been the film locations for six episodes of the popular TV series Midsomer Murders.

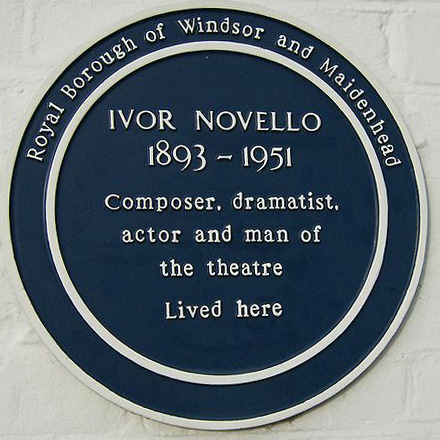
Blue Plaque commemorating Ivor Novello on the wall of Redroofs Theatre School at Littlewick Green

.
