= Maria Vittoria Ottoboni =

Italian stage actress, writer, and salonist

Maria Vittoria Ottoboni (1721–1790) was an Italian stage actress, writer and salonist.

She married the Duke Gabrio Serbelloni in 1741 but separated from him shortly afterward. She hosted a literary salon in Palazzo Serbelloni in Milan, which became a famous meeting place for the artistic and literary world in Milan. She acted as the patron of many artists. She translated, wrote, and commissioned plays for her private theatre, where she acted herself.

Works

- Il teatro comico del signor Destouches dell'Accademia Francese novellamente in nostra Favella trasportato, Milano, 1754–55
- Il curioso indiscreto, Venezia, 1773
