= The Widow of Malabar =

1790 play

- Original language: English
- Written by: Mariana Starke
- Based on: La Veuve de Malabar (1770) by Antoine-Marin Lemierre
- Genre: Drama
- Setting: Malabar Coast, India

Premiere
- Date: 5 May 1790
- Place: Theatre Royal, Covent Garden, London

The Widow of Malabar is a 1790 tragedy by the British writer Mariana Starke. It premiered at the Theatre Royal, Covent Garden on 5 May 1790. The original cast included William Farren as Raymond, George Davies Harley as Chief Bramin, William Powell as Second Bramin, Joseph George Holman as Young Bramin, James Thompson as Narrain, Ann Brunton Merry as Indamora and Mrs Rock as Fatima.

Starke's play is an adaptation of the French playwright Antoine-Marin Lemierre's La Veuve de Malabar (1770). Both Starke's drama and its source material center on a British officer who saves an Indian woman from committing suicide via widow-burning, but while both characters have a romantic relationship with one another Lemierre's play, in The Widow of Malabar, relations between the two are purely platonic.

== Bibliography ==
- Greene, John C. Theatre in Dublin, 1745-1820: A Calendar of Performances, Volume 6. Lexington Books, 2011.
- Nicoll, Allardyce. A History of English Drama 1660–1900: Volume IV. Cambridge University Press, 2009.
- Burroughs, Catherine. Women in British Romantic Theatre: Drama, Performance, and Society, 1790-1840. Cambridge University Press, 2000.
