= Thomas Hearne (antiquarian) =

English antiquary & historian (1678–1735)

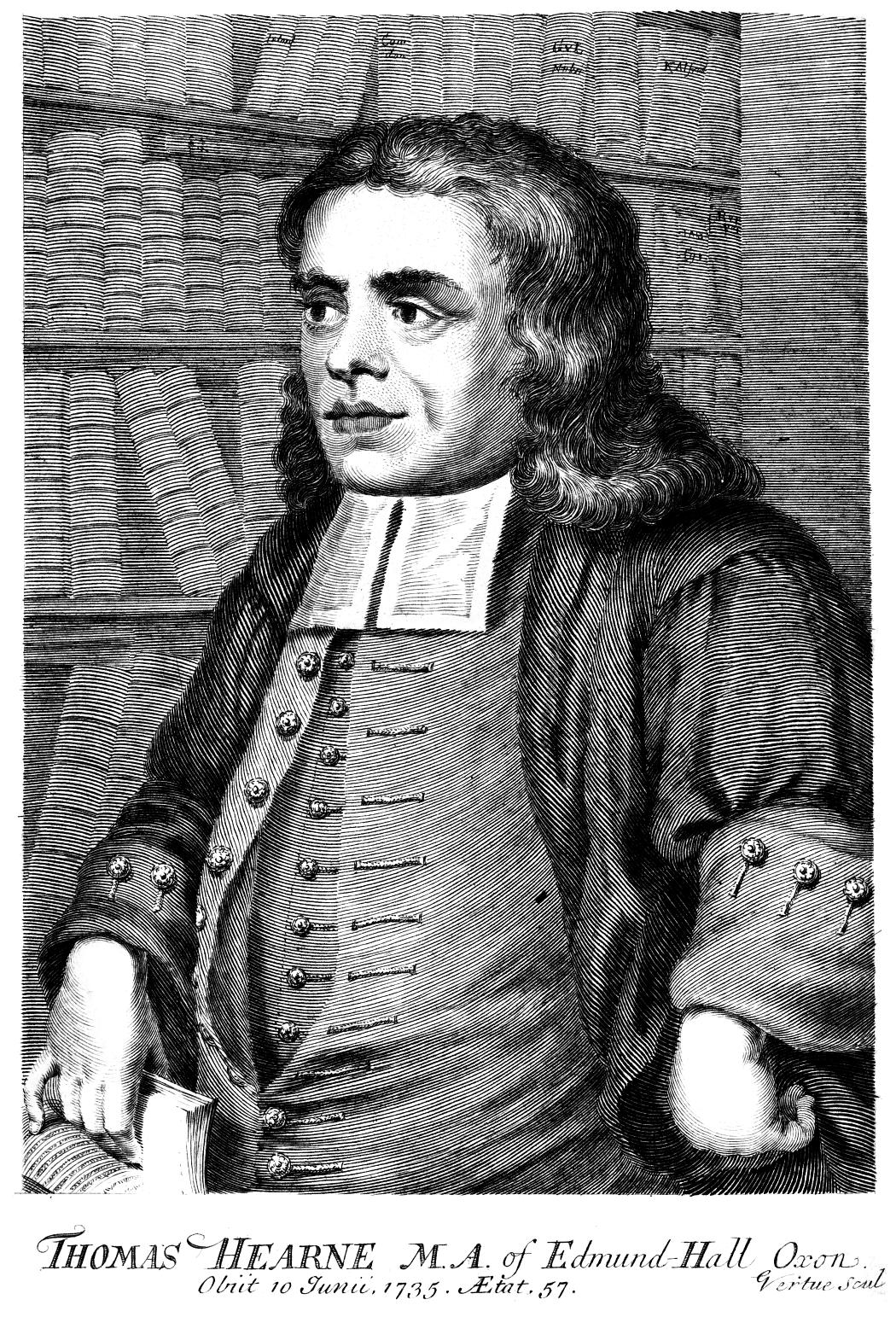
- Portrait of Hearne, taken from "The Life of Anthony à Wood" by Anthony Wood (1772)
- Born: July 1678; White Waltham, Berkshire, England
- Died: 10 June 1735 (aged 56–57); Oxford, Oxfordshire
- Education: St Edmund Hall, Oxford
- Occupations: Editor, antiquary

Thomas Hearne or Hearn (Latin: Thomas Hearnius, July 1678 – 10 June 1735) was an English diarist and prolific antiquary, particularly remembered for his published editions of many medieval English chronicles and other important historical texts.

== Life ==
Hearne was born at Littlefield Green in the parish of White Waltham, Berkshire, the son of George Hearn, the parish clerk. Having received his early education from his father, he showed such taste for study that a wealthy neighbour, Francis Cherry of Shottesbrooke (c. 1665–1713), a celebrated nonjuror, interested himself in the boy, and sent him to the school at Bray "on purpose to learn the Latin tongue". Soon Cherry took him into his own house, and his education was continued at Bray until Easter 1696 when he matriculated at St Edmund Hall, Oxford.

At the university, he attracted the attention of Dr John Mill (1645–1707), the principal of St Edmund Hall, who employed him to compare manuscripts and in other ways. Having taken the degree of B.A. in 1699 he was made assistant keeper of the Bodleian Library, where he worked on the catalogue of books, and in 1712 he was appointed second keeper. In 1715 Hearne was elected Architypographus and Esquire Bedell in civil law in the university, but objection having been made to his holding this office together with that of second librarian, he resigned it in the same year.

A nonjuror himself, he refused to take the oaths of allegiance to King George I, and early in 1716 he was deprived of his librarianship, and "he was, in fact, locked out of the library". However, he continued to reside in Oxford, and occupied himself in editing the English chroniclers. Hearne refused several important academic positions, including the librarianship of the Bodleian and the Camden professorship of ancient history, rather than take the oaths. He died on 10 June 1735, and was buried in the graveyard of St Peter-in-the-East, now deconsecrated.

The readers of Hearne's works were devoted to them because of the depth of scholarship. He corresponded, for example, with Dr Henry Levett, an early English physician and medical doctor at Charterhouse, London. In November 1715, indicating the devotion of Hearne's readers, he reminded Dr Levett that "you formerly desired to be a subscriber for every Thing I published. I have accordingly put you down for one copy of Acts of the Ap. in Capitals".

== Works ==
Hearne's most important work was done as editor of many of the English chronicles. Until the appearance of the Rolls Series, his editions were in some cases the only ones existent. Some have praised them for being well prepared and sourced.

Among the most important of a long list are:

- Benedict of Peterborough's (Benedictus Abbas) De vita et gestis Henrici II. et Ricardi I. (1735)
- John of Fordun's Scotichronicon (1722)
- the monk of Evesham's Historia vitae et regni Ricardi II (1729)
- Robert Mannyng's translation of Piers Langtoft's Chronicle (1725)
- the work of Thomas Otterbourne and John Whethamstede as Duo rerum Anglicarum scriptores veteres (1732)
- Robert of Gloucester's Chronicle (1724)
- the Vita Henrici V of Tito Livio Frulovisi (1716)
- Walter of Hemingburgh's Chronicon (1731)
- William of Newburgh's Historia rerum Anglicarum (1719).

He also edited:

- John Leland's Itinerary (1710–1712) and the same author's Collectanea (1715)
- William Camden's Annales rerum Anglicarum et Hibernicarum regnante Elizabetha (1717)
- Sir John Spelman's Life of Alfred (1709)
- William Roper's Life of Sir Thomas More (1716).

He brought out editions of:

- Livy (1708)
- Pliny's Epistolae et panegyricus (1703)
- Acts of the Apostles (1715).

Among his other compilations were:

- Ductor historicus, a Short System of Universal History (1698, 1704, 1705, 1714, 1724)
- A Collection of Curious Discourses by Eminent Antiquaries (1720)
- Reliquiae Bodleianae (1703).

Hearne left his manuscripts to William Bedford, who sold them to Dr Richard Rawlinson, who in his turn bequeathed them to the Bodleian. Two volumes of extracts from his voluminous diary were published by Philip Bliss (Oxford, 1857), and afterwards an enlarged edition in three volumes appeared (London, 1869). A large part of his diary entitled Remarks and Collections, 1705–1714, edited by C. E. Doble and D. W. Rannie, has been published by the Oxford Historical Society (1885–1898). Bibliotheca Hearniana, excerpts from the catalogue of Hearne's library, was edited by Beriah Botfield (1848).

=== Criticism ===
Hearne's work in publishing old manuscripts was not appreciated by all. Among Hearne's contemporaries, Alexander Pope has written numerous remarks disparaging his works. In An Epistle to Burlington, Pope dismissed Hearne's publications as unappealing and "monkish," while in The Dunciad he satirises Hearne as a pedant named Wormius, dropping into mock-Old English to do so. This in turn led Hearne in his diary to insult Pope's lack of scholarship. After Hearne's death, Pope published an assessment of Hearne and his works in 1735. Pope indirectly mocks Hearne's habit of appending poetical fragments (of dubious literary merits and unclear provenance) within his publications and gives lengthy corrections to various editorial mistakes Hearne has made. Pope concludes his assessment with a wholly negative portrayal of Hearne:

Thus after wasting, not employing, a Life of Fifty odd Years, on the Tenth Day of June 1735, this Studier and Preserver of Monkish-Trumpery gave up the Ghost. He was a most sordid poor Wretch; had an universal Mistrust of the Generality of Mankind; lived in a slovenly, [stingy] Manner, and died possessed of what he had not the Heart to enjoy.

— Alexander Pope, Mr. Pope's literary correspondence. Volume the third (1735)

A number of subsequent writers also find Hearne's editorial practice and antiquarian approach to be problematic. J. Horace Round quoted two scholars who assessed Hearne as an "industrious but uncritical [antiquary] who had no conception of the duties of an editor o[r] the importance of accuracy," and whose works are littered with unreliable remarks due to his "superficial examination" of old documents. Some of Hearne's editions which scholars now consider to be misattributed include:

- Thomae Sprotti Chronica (1719). Hearne's title is misleading; The work is attributable to end of the 14th century, which is far too late for Thomas Sprott the Benedictine chronicler (fl. 1292).
- Vita et gesta Henrici quinti (1727). Hearne wrongly attributed the work to Thomas Elmham. The author now goes under the designation Pseudo-Elmham.
