= George Monck Berkeley =

English playwright and author (1763–1793)

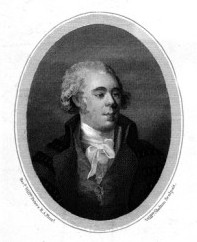
- Born: 8 February 1763; Bray, Berkshire, England
- Died: 26 January 1793 (aged 29); Cheltenham, Gloucestershire, England
- Occupations: Playwright; author
- Parent(s): George Berkeley; Eliza Frinsham
- Relatives: George Berkeley (grandfather)

George Monck Berkeley (8 February 1763 – 26 January 1793) was an English playwright and author, now remembered as a biographer of Jonathan Swift. He is usually called Monck Berkeley.

== Life ==
Berkeley was born on 8 February 1763 at Bray, Berkshire. His mother was Eliza Berkeley née Frinsham, and his father was the Rev. George Berkeley, a son of George Berkeley the philosopher. A precocious youth, Monck Berkeley went to King's School, Canterbury, and then at age 12 to Eton College. From 16 he was tutored for two years by his father; then went to the University of St Andrews. At age 19, Berkeley was elected a corresponding member of the Edinburgh Society of Antiquaries. He was admitted as a student of the Inner Temple in 1783, and matriculated at Magdalen Hall, Oxford in 1786.

In October 1787, Berkeley delivered his own prologue at the opening of the playhouse at Blenheim Palace. In 1789 he visited Ireland, and was made LL.B. of Trinity College, Dublin. While in Dublin, Berkeley found Richard Brenan, the servant who attended Jonathan Swift in his last days. Berkeley gave Brenan a small pension.

In poor health, Berkeley moved to Dover. He finally moved on to Cheltenham in Gloucestershire, where he died on 26 January 1793.

== Works ==
In 1787, Berkeley published Nina, a comedy in two acts, translated from the French in six hours. His next drama was Love and Nature,' a musical piece in one act written in blank verse, performed 1789 in Dublin, and published in 1797. It was based on Matthew Prior's Emma and Henry, itself a modernisation of the ballad The Nut-Brown Maid.

Berkeley in 1789 published Literary Relics, a book of research and edited correspondence. The contents are:

1. An Inquiry into the Life of Dean Swift;
2. Letters of Charles II, James II, and Elizabeth of Bohemia;
3. Correspondence of Swift;
4. Eighty-six letters of Bishop George Berkeley, mainly addressed to Thomas Prior;
5. Letters of William Congreve, Joseph Addison, and Richard Steele.

The biography of Swift contains the story of his marriage by St George Ashe to Esther Johnson, his "Stella". Whether this marriage took place is still unsettled, as a matter of scholarship.

Berkeley wrote anonymously Maria, or the generous rustic, and Heloise; or the siege of Rhodes (1788). As a poet he was classed as one of the Della Cruscans. Eliza Berkeley edited a collection Poems (1797) of her late son's work. Its preface is revealing of her own life.

Moving in High Church circles, Berkeley was a correspondent of George Horne, and his mother's edition of his poems defended Dean John Lynch. He was involved in an intrigue of his father and George Gleig against Abernethy Drummond, publishing an anonymous pamphlet to Episcopalian Scots.
