= Henry Dodwell (religious controversialist) =

Henry Dodwell (25 November 1706 – 1784) was a British religious controversialist and lawyer.

Dodwell was the son of the theologian Henry Dodwell. He was born in Shottesbrooke, Berkshire, and educated at Magdalen Hall, Oxford. He was awarded a BA in 1726 and then studied Law, becoming a barrister in 1738.

He is mainly known as the author of Christianity Not Founded on Argument (1741), which, while it ostensibly argued for a fideist position - it suggested that reason could not be the foundation of Christian faith - was actually a satire on William Law's The Case of Reason (1731). Many pious Christians took the work at face value, and it was recommended to John Wesley, who however noted that the book was in fact intended to show that Christianity was not reasonable: "the great design uniformly pursued throughout the work was to render the whole of the Christian institution both odious and contemptible." Although the book was published anonymously, it was well known that Dodwell was the author.

The book prompted a variety of responses from critics of its thesis, including George Benson (The Reasonableness of the Christian Religion as Delivered in the Scriptures, 1743), John Leland (Remarks on a Late Pamphlet, Entitled, ‘Christianity not Founded on Argument’, 1744), Thomas Randolph (The Christian Faith a Rational Assent, 1744) and Dodwell's brother William Dodwell.

Dodwell died in 1784.
