= A Journey Around My Room =

1794 book by Xavier de Maistre

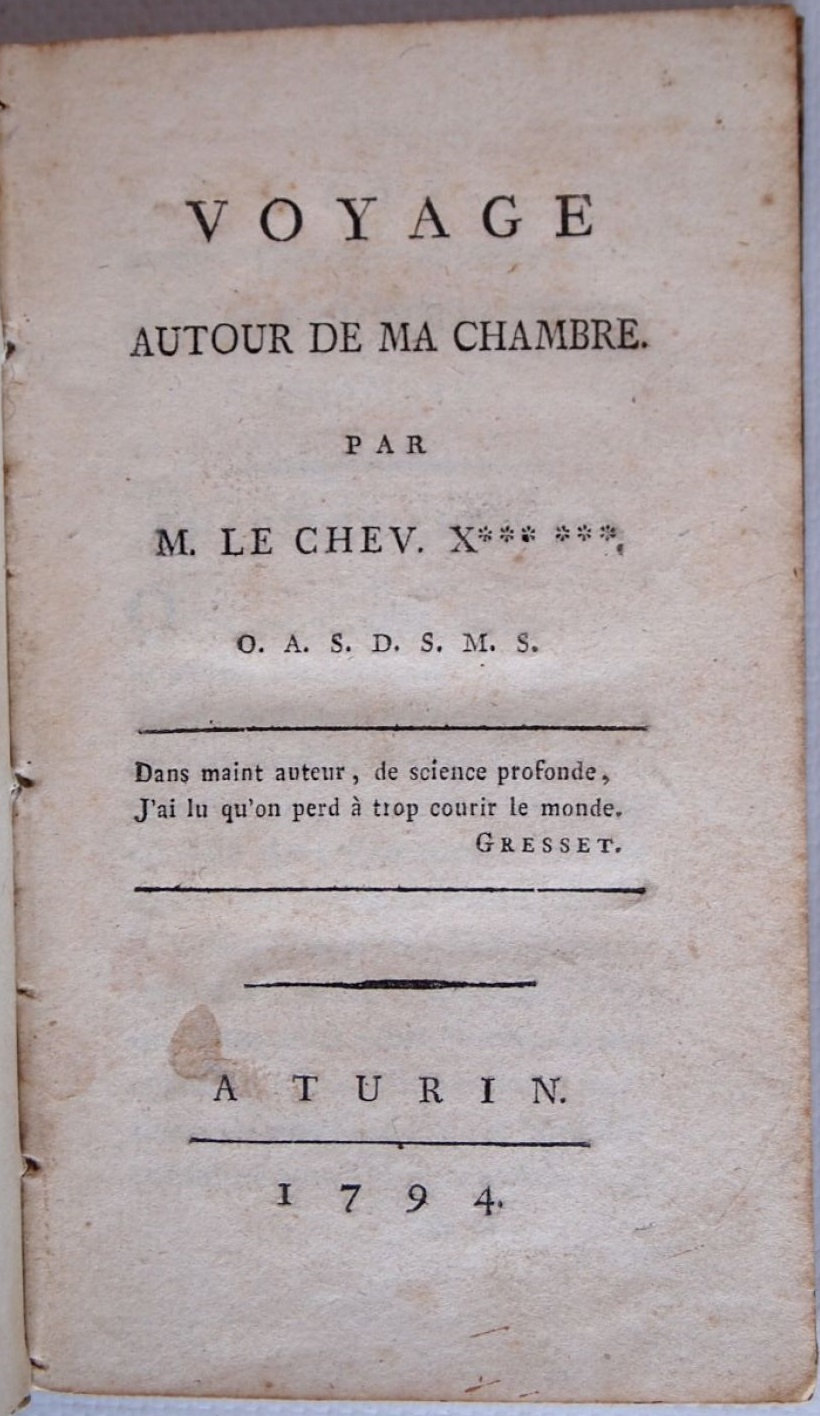
- Title page of first edition (Turin 1794)
- Author: Xavier de Maistre
- Language: French, in English translation since 1871
- Genre: Travelogue
- Publication date: 1794
- Publication place: Kingdom of Sardinia

A Journey Around My Room (originally published in French as Voyage autour de ma chambre) is a 1794 book by Xavier de Maistre. It was written to stave off boredom whilst the author was serving a 42-day sentence of confinement to his room for participating in an illegal duel. The book is written in the style of a travelogue and discusses the contents and furniture of his room as well as imaginary situations and dialogues. The theme of the work is that pleasure can be found in one's everyday surroundings. At the end of the work he notes his regret at having to return to society. The work is thought to have been first published in English in 1871. A sequel, A Nocturnal Expedition Around My Room, was published in 1825.

== Background ==
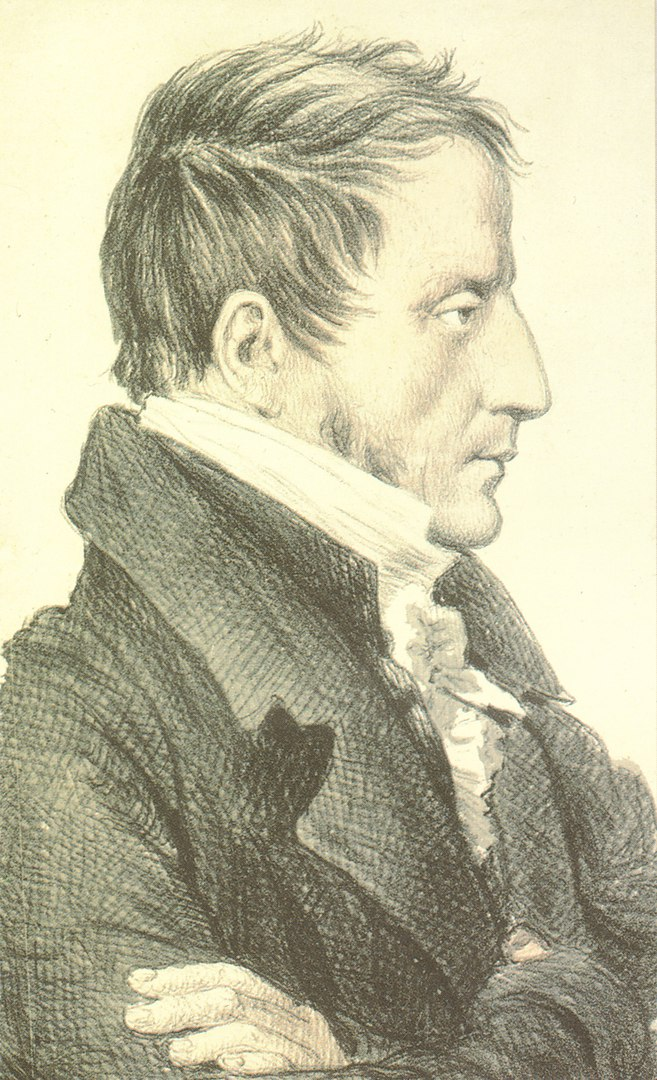
A self-portrait of de Maistre, c. 1825

Xavier de Maistre was a French aristocrat who, after the French Revolution, fled to Turin to join a counter-revolutionary army. Whilst in Turin in spring 1790 de Maistre fought an illegal duel for which he was sentenced to 42 days house arrest. The terms of his confinement required him to stay within his room. To alleviate his boredom he began work on the book that would become A Journey Around My Room. De Maistre thought it little more than a means of filling time but his brother, the philosopher Joseph de Maistre, read the work and insisted that it reach a wider audience and it was published in 1794.

== Content ==
The book is written in the style of an 18th-century travelogue but within the confines of de Maistre's room, which he describes as a "parallelogram of thirty-six steps around". It is divided into 42 chapters, one for each day of his confinement, and records the distance travelled each day. Alain de Botton, writing in the Financial Times in 2020, describes it as "a charming shaggy-dog story".

De Maistre begins by describing himself changing into a pink-and-blue pajamas. He describes a trip to the sofa, noting the elegance of its feet and recounting the hours he has spent sat upon it. De Maistre then describes his bed and his gratitude for the many nights sleep he has had there. He remarks upon his pride in the bedsheets that are a close match for his pajamas and advises every man who can to get himself pink-and-white bed linen, claiming the colours induce calm and help sleep. He also discusses his armchair, curtains, desk, travelling coat, his dog and some elm trees he can see from his window. The book's great moment of calamity comes when de Maistre falls over his chair and requires the assistance of a servant to return to his feet. At one point de Maistre references the Anglo-Irish writer Laurence Sterne, whom he admired.

Nicholas Lezard, writing in The Guardian in 2013, perceives the impact of the revolutionary violence upon the work. He notes that in one passage de Maistre describes "a white bear, a philosopher, a tiger or some other animal of that sort" entering the orchestra during a concert and urging the audience to bloodshed: "Let women, too, dip their timid hands in blood! Leave! You are free! Tear down your king from his throne, and your God from his sanctuary! ... Weren't they dancing in Paris five years ago?". At another point de Maistre muses upon a pastoral landscape painting on his wall. Foreseeing the arrival of soldiers upon the scene he urges the shepherdess in the painting to flee. He also writes imaginary dialogues with classical figures and muses on his absent love, Jenny.

De Maistre's theme is that the pleasure found in new places is dependent upon the traveller's mindset and that a person's own locality can be as fascinating as a foreign land. Although his text professes the opposite Lezard claimed to detect the author's boredom and sexual frustration. At the end of the work de Maistre expresses his regret upon leaving his confinement of returning to his previous life noting that "the yoke of office is again to weigh me down, and every step I take must conform with the exigencies of politeness and duty". He notes "the pleasure to be found in travelling round one's room ... is independent of Fortune".

== Later events ==
By the time of the book's publication de Maistre's native Savoy had fallen to the revolutionaries and he had travelled to Saint Petersburg to join the Russian Army. It was there, in 1799, he began his sequel A Nocturnal Expedition Around My Room. This was based on a similar premise, though in this book he made it as far as the window ledge. It took de Maistre until 1824 to finish writing the sequel and it was published the following year.

A Journey Around My Room is thought to have been first translated into English by Henry Attwell in 1871. A translation by Stephen Sartarelli was published in 2016 as A Voyage Around My Room. In 2021 a group of Slovenian furniture designers released a range of furniture inspired by the book; they stated that the furniture was intended to boost their owner's sense of wellbeing.
