= Henry Dodwell (priest) =

Henry Dodwell was an Anglican priest in Ireland during the 17th century.

Dodwell was educated at Trinity College, Dublin. Dodwell was ordained deacon at Tuam in September 1634 and priest at Elphin in June 1636. He was the incumbent at Rathfarnham then Precentor of Elphin Cathedral. He was Dean of Killala from 1674 until his death in 1701.
