= Antoine-Marin Lemierre =

French dramatist and poet

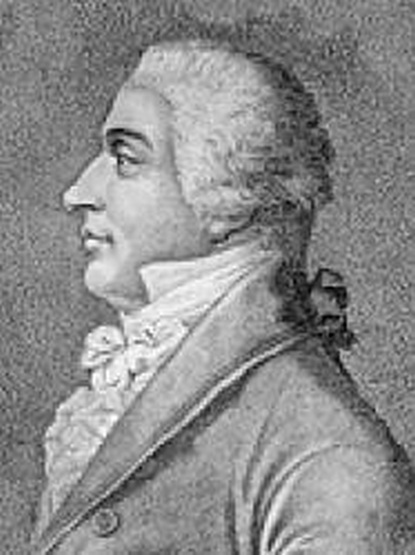
Antoine-Marin Lemierre.

Antoine-Marin Lemierre (12 January 1733 – 29 June or 4 July 1793) was a French dramatist and poet.

== Life ==
Lemierre was born in Paris to a poor family but secured patronage from the collector-general of taxes, Dupin, eventually becoming his secretary. Lemierre achieved his initial theatrical success with Hypermnestre (1758); Titre (1761) and Idomne (1764) failed on account of the subjects. Artaxerce, modelled on Metastasio, and Guillaume Tell were produced in 1766; other successful tragedies were La Veuve de Malabar (1770) and Barnavelt (1784). He was admitted to the Académie française in 1780.

In 1786, Lemierre successfully revived Guillaume Tell to great acclaim. Following the French Revolution, Lemierre expressed profound remorse for having produced a play that promoted revolutionary ideals. It is widely believed that the trauma of witnessing the revolution's excesses contributed to his untimely death. Lemierre published La Peinture (1769), based on a Latin poem by the abbé de Marsy, and a poem in six cantos. Les Fastes, ou les usages de lannie (1779), an unsatisfactory imitation of Ovid's Fasti.

His Œuvres (1810) contain a notice of Lemierre by R. Perrin. and his Œuvres choisies (1811) contain one by F. Fayolle.
