= John Whethamstede =

English abbot and literary figure (died 1465)

John in the Golden Book of St Albans

John Whethamstede (died 20 January 1465) was an English abbot and one of the leading literary figures in fifteenth-century England.

== Life ==
He was a son of Hugh and Margaret Bostock, and was born at Wheathampstead in Hertfordshire, owing his name, the Latin form of which is Frumentarius, to this circumstance.

After early schooling at the Abbey School (now St Albans School) he entered St Albans Abbey when only sixteen. He was chosen abbot of this Benedictine monastery in 1420. In 1423, Whethamstede attended the Council of Siena. In the Kingdom of England, his time was mainly occupied with lawsuits, several of which he carried on to defend the property and enforce the rights of the abbey.

In 1440, he resigned his post but, in 1451, on the death of his successor John Stoke, he became abbot for the second time. He died on 20 January 1465, and his tomb was recently discovered during archaeological excavations prior to the construction of the new Welcome Centre at St Albans Abbey.

Whethamstede was an energetic and successful abbot. He greatly improved the buildings at St Albans. He was an eyewitness of the First Battle of St Albans in 1455, the first open conflict of the Wars of the Roses. It is also likely that he was in attendance when Richard, Duke of York made his claim for the throne in October 1460, which resulted in the Act of Accord. He also did some building at Gloucester College, Oxford.

He was also closely, if clumsily, associated with the humanistic activities of Henry V's youngest brother, Humphrey, Duke of Gloucester, who died in 1447 and was buried in St Albans Abbey, where he was honoured as a benefactor.

== Writings ==
Whethamstede's Chronicle, or the Registrum abbatiae Johannis Whethamstede, is a register compiled soon after the abbot's death, telling the events of his second abbacy. It was edited by H. T. Riley, and is in volume i. of the Registra quorundam abbalum monasterii S. Albani (London, 1872). The events of his first abbacy are narrated in the Annales monasterii S. Albani of John Amundesham, also edited by Riley (London, 1870–1871). Whethamstede's works also included Granarium de viris illustribus; Palearium poetarum, and Super Valerium in Augustinum de Anchona.

Whethamstede was "shy and bashful in public, yet egotistical and boastful in his writings". He read widely — as well as commonplace medieval texts, works in Latin, Greek and Italian were in his library.

== Bibliography ==
- Hicks, Michael (1991). Who's who in late medieval England (1272-1485). London: Shepheard-Walwyn. ISBN 0-85683-125-5.
- Hunt, William (1899). "Whethamstede, John" . In Lee, Sidney (ed.). Dictionary of National Biography. Vol. 60. London: Smith, Elder & Co.
- Clark, James G. "Whethamstede, John (c.1392–1465)". Oxford Dictionary of National Biography (online ed.). Oxford University Press. doi:10.1093/ref:odnb/29197. (Subscription, Wikipedia Library access or UK public library membership required.)
