= Henry Dodwell =

Anglo-Irish scholar, theologian and controversial writer

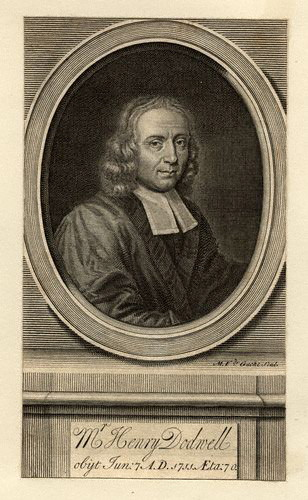
- Born: October 1641; Dublin
- Died: 7 June 1711 (aged 69); Shottesbrooke
- Education: Trinity College, Dublin

Henry Dodwell (October 1641 – 7 June 1711) was an Anglo-Irish scholar, theologian and controversial writer.

== Life ==
Dodwell was born in Dublin in 1641. His father, William Dodwell, who lost his property in Connacht during the Irish rebellion, was married to Elizabeth Slingsby, daughter of Sir Francis Slingsby and settled at York in 1648. Henry received his preliminary education at St Peter's School, York.

In 1654 he was sent by his uncle to Trinity College, Dublin, where he became a scholar and fellow, receiving the Bachelor of Arts in 1662 and Master of Arts in 1663. Having conscientious objections to taking religious orders, he relinquished his fellowship in 1666, but in 1688 was elected Camden professor of history at Oxford. In 1691 he was deprived of his professorship for refusing to take the oath of allegiance to William and Mary.

Dodwell retired to Shottesbrooke in Berkshire to be near his friend, Francis Cherry. As the movement behind the refusal to swear allegiance declined, with the death of William Lloyd who had been deprived of his bishopric, and the decision by Thomas Ken to relinquish his claim to the See of Bath and Wells, Dodwell returned to the Church of England in 1710.

He died in Shottesbrooke.

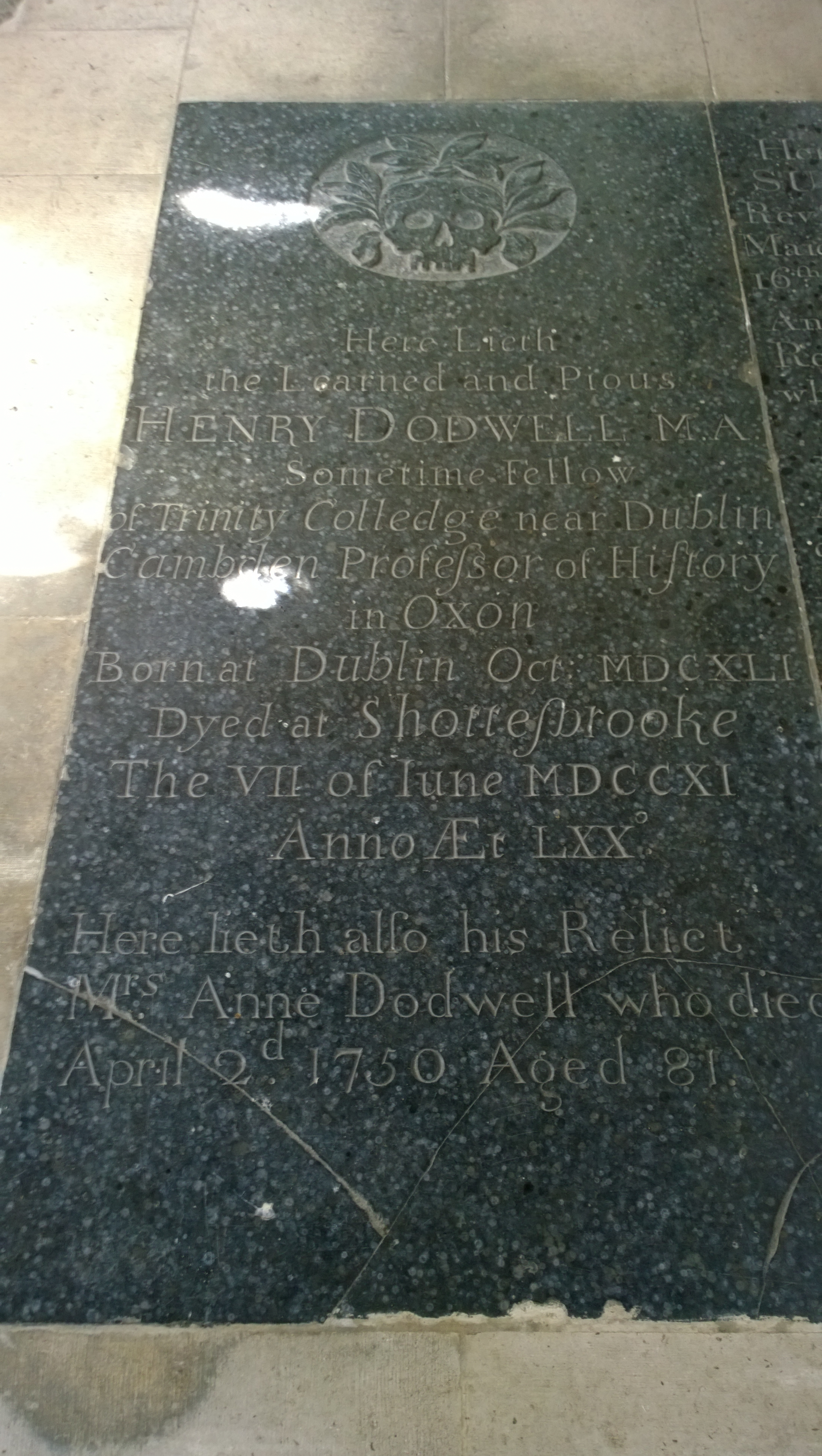

== Works ==
Living on the produce of a small estate in Ireland, he devoted himself to the study of chronology and ecclesiastical polity, providing a defence of the deprived nonjuring bishops. Edward Gibbon speaks of his learning as "immense," and says that his "skill in employing facts is equal to his learning," although he severely criticises his method and style. Dodwell's works on ecclesiastical polity are more numerous than those on chronology.

In his ecclesiastical writings he was regarded as one of the greatest champions of the non-jurors; but the doctrine which he afterwards promulgated, that the soul is naturally mortal, and that immortality could be enjoyed only by those who had received baptism from the hands of one set of regularly ordained clergy, and was therefore a privilege from which dissenters were hopelessly excluded, did not strengthen his reputation.

Bishop Burnet thus addresses him in one of his letters : "You are a learned man ; and your life has been not only without blemish, but exemplary ; but you do not seem to remember, or enough to consider, the woe our Saviour has denounced against those by whom scandals come ; and, according to the true notion of scandal, I know no man, that has laid more in the way of the little ones, or weaker Christians, than you have done. I do assure you, I would rather wish that I could neither read nor write, than to have read or writ to such purposes as you have been pursuing now above thirty years. You seem to love novelties and paradoxes, and to employ your learning to support them. I do assure you, I have a just value for many valuable things that I know to be in you ; and do heartily lament every thing that is otherwise."

== Dissertations upon Irenaeus ==
Printed 1689 in Latin under the title of Dissertationes in Irenaeum. These Dissertations are only prolegomena to what he further designed to show what the ancient heresies were, what disturbed the primitive Church, and their foundation.

We have at this day, certain most authentic ecclesiastical writers of the times, as Clemens Romanus, Barnabas, Hermas, Ignatius, and Polycarp, who wrote in the same order wherein I have named them, and after all the writers of the New Testament. But in Hermas you will not find one passage, or any mention of the New Testament, nor in all the rest is any one of the evangelists named. If sometimes they cite passages like those we read in our gospels, you will find them so changed, and for the most part so interpolated, that it cannot be known whether they produced them out of ours, or some apocryphal gospels. Nay, they sometimes cite passages which most certainly are not in our present gospels.

== Bibliography ==
His chief works on classical chronology are:

- A Discourse concerning Sanchoniathon's Phoenician History (1681)
- Dissertations upon Irenaeus (1689)
- Chronologia Graeco-Romana pro hypothesibus Dion. Halicarnassei (1692)
- Annales Velleiani, Quintilianei, Statiani (1698)
- a larger treatise entitled De veteribus Graecorum Romanorumque Cyclis (1701).
- Annales Thucydidei et Xenophontei (1702)

== Family ==
His eldest son, also named Henry Dodwell, was the author of a pamphlet entitled Christianity not founded on Argument, to which a reply was published by his brother William Dodwell (1709–1785), who was concurrently engaged in a controversy with Conyers Middleton on the subject of miracles. The pamphlet received many published replies at the time, and even as late as 1904 replies were still being made. Even the great Jonathan Swift was moved to write a reply against it.
