= Xavier de Maistre =

French writer (1763–1852)

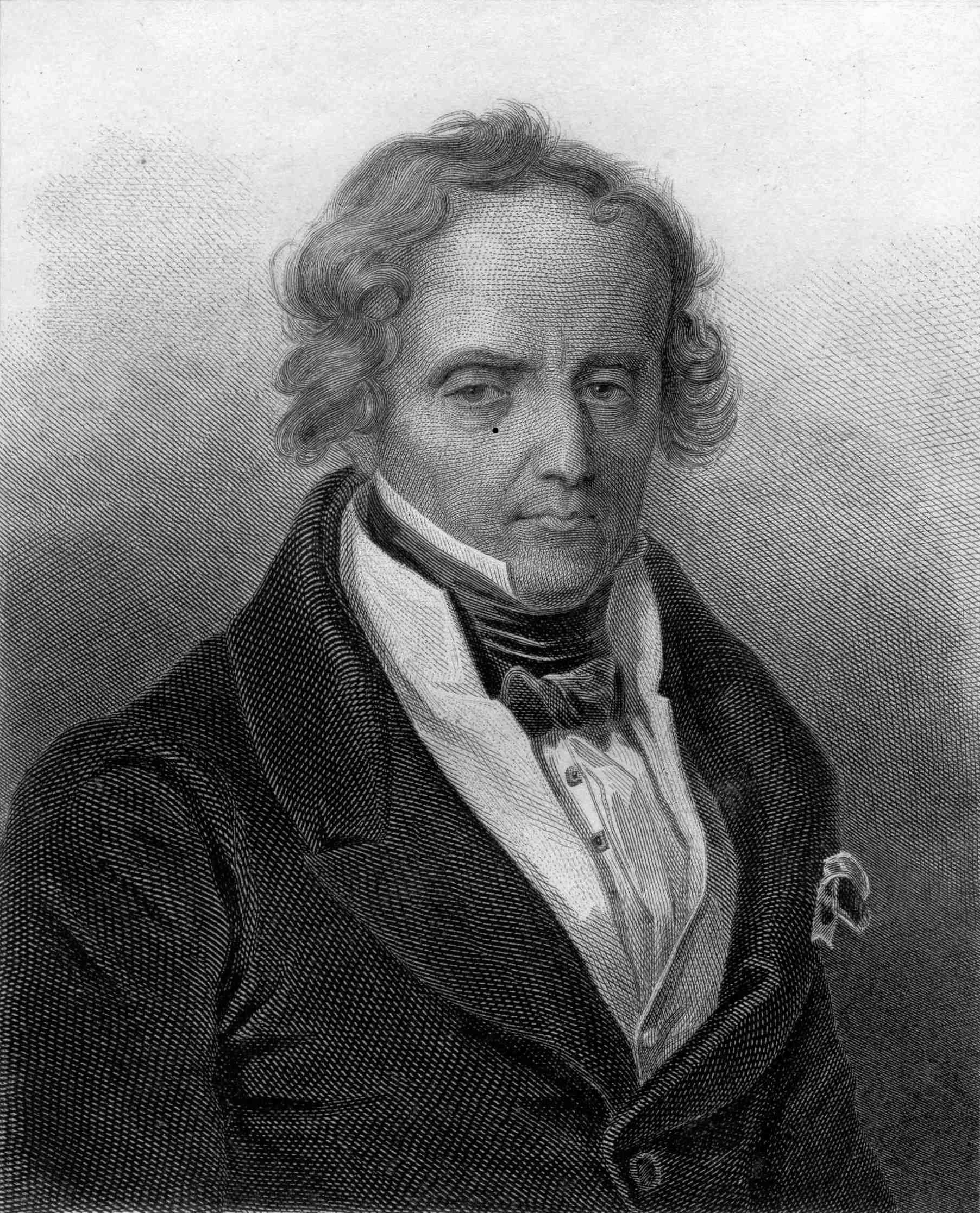
- Born: 10 October 1763; Chambéry, Savoy, Kingdom of Piemont-Sardinia (now Department of Savoie, France)
- Died: 12 June 1852 (aged 88); Saint Petersburg, Russian Empire
- Resting place: Smolensky Lutheran Cemetery, St. Petersburg
- Occupations: Writer, painter, militaryman
- Notable work: Voyage autour de ma chambre
- Relatives: Joseph de Maistre

Xavier de Maistre (French pronunciation: [ɡzavje də mɛstʁ]; 10 October 1763 – 12 June 1852) of Savoy (then part of the Kingdom of Piedmont-Sardinia) was a military man and author. The younger brother of Joseph de Maistre, a noted philosopher and counter-revolutionary, Xavier was born to an aristocratic family at Chambéry in October 1763. He served when young in the army of Piedmont-Sardinia, and in 1790 wrote his fantasy Voyage autour de ma chambre ("Voyage Around My Room", published 1794), when he was under arrest in Turin as the consequence of a duel.

== Life ==
Xavier shared the political sympathies of his brother Joseph, and after a French revolutionary army annexed Savoy to France in 1792, he left the service and eventually took a commission in the Russian army. He served under Alexander Suvorov in his victorious Austro-Russian campaign and accompanied the marshal to Russia in 1796. By then, Suvorov's patron Catherine II of Russia had died, and the new monarch Paul I dismissed the victorious general (partly on account of the massacre of 20,000 Poles after he conquered Warsaw). Xavier de Maistre shared the disgrace of his general, and supported himself for some time in St. Petersburg by miniature painting, particularly landscapes.

In 1803, Joseph de Maistre was appointed as Piedmont-Sardinia's ambassador to the court of Alexander I, Tsar of Russia. On his brother's arrival in St. Petersburg, Xavier de Maistre was introduced to the Minister of the Navy, and was appointed to several posts including director of the Library, and of the Museum of Admiralty. He also joined active service, and was wounded in the Caucasus, attaining the rank of major-general. In 1812 he married a Russian noblewoman, Sophia Ivanovna Zagryazhskaya (1778–1851), the maternal aunt to Natalia Pushkina. He remained in Russia even after the overthrow of Napoleon and the consequent restoration of the Piedmontese dynasty.

== Literary work ==
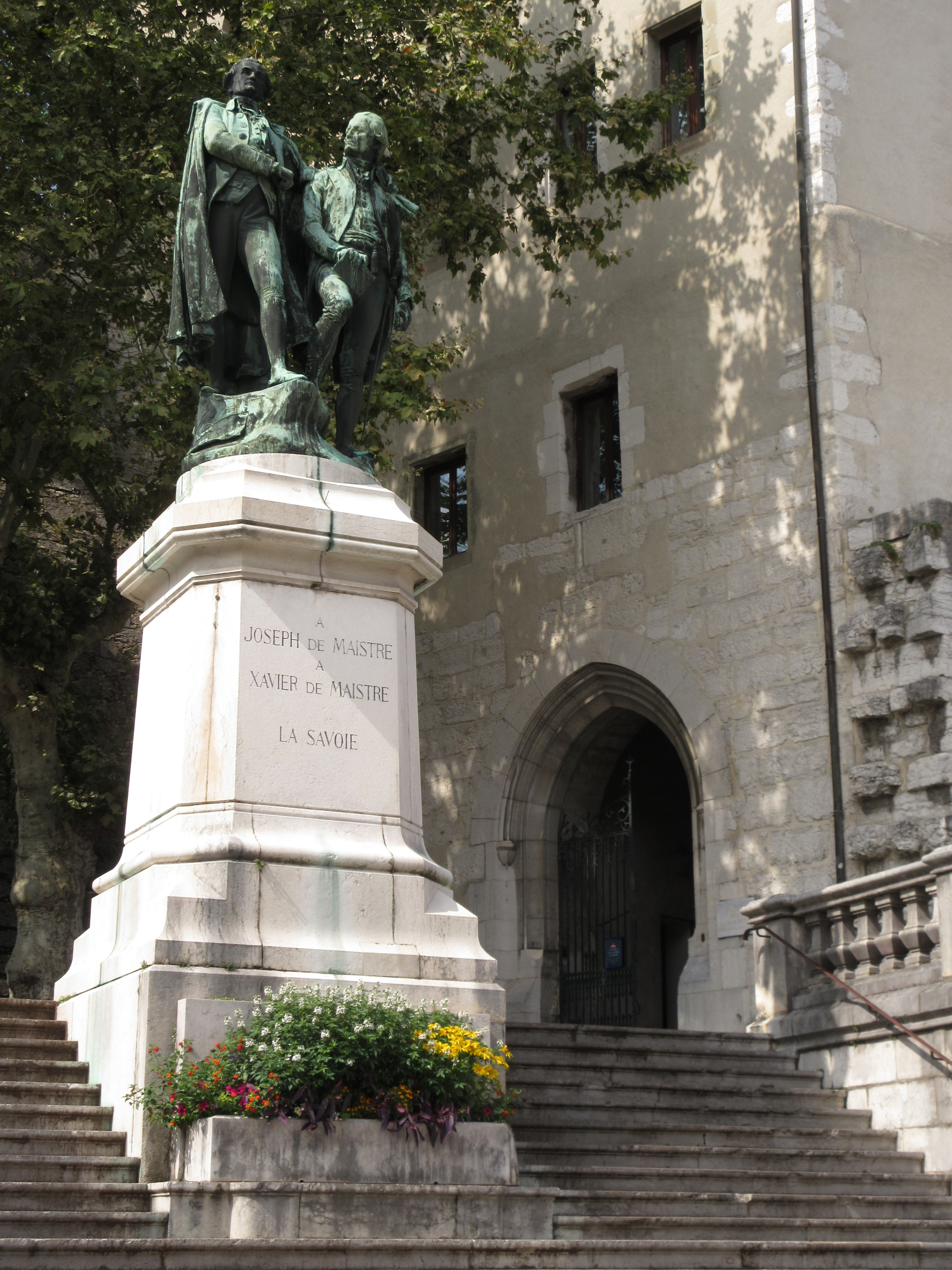
Memorial of Joseph and Xavier de Maistre in front of the Castle of Chambéry

His Voyage autour de ma chambre (1794), a parody set in the tradition of the grand travel narrative, is an autobiographical account of how a young official, imprisoned in his room for six weeks, looks at the furniture, engravings, etc., as if they were scenes from a voyage in a strange land. He praises this voyage because it does not cost anything, and for this reason, it is strongly recommended to the poor, the infirm, and the lazy. His room is a long square, and the perimeter is thirty-six paces. He writes: "When I travel through my room, I rarely follow a straight line: I go from the table towards a picture hanging in a corner; from there, I set out obliquely towards the door; but even though, when I begin, it really is my intention to go there, if I happen to meet my armchair en route, I don't think twice about it, and settle down in it without further ado." Later, proceeding North, he encounters his bed, and in this way, he lightheartedly continues his "Voyage". This work is remarkable for its play with the reader's imagination, along the lines of Laurence Sterne, whom Xavier admired. Xavier did not think much of Voyage, but his brother Joseph had it published.

Most of his other works are of modest dimensions; these include

- Le Lépreux de la Cité d'Aoste ("The Leper from Aosta", 1811), a touching humane story in a simple style, involving a dialogue between a leper who reminisces with a soldier about his lost youth and his sequestered life in a tower with a view of the Alps,
- Les Prisonniers du Caucase ("The Prisoners of the Caucasus", 1825), a powerful sketch of Russian character,
- La Jeune Sibérienne ("The Young Siberian", 1825), a true story of Praskovia Lupolova who left on foot from Ishim in the depth of Siberia to go to Saint Petersburg to ask Tsar Alexander I for the grace of her father, and
- Expédition Nocturne Autour de ma Chambre ("Night Voyage Around My Room", 1825), a sequel to Voyage Autour de ma Chambre.

In 1839, after the publication of a French edition of La Jeune Sibérienne (1825), Maistre went on a long journey to Paris and Savoy. He was surprised to find himself well-known in literary circles. Alphonse de Lamartine dedicated a poem to him (Retour, 1826) praising his genius: "the future sons will say ... it is your heart, which through your mellifluous writings you have passed to us". He met Charles Augustin Sainte-Beuve, who has left some pleasant reminiscences of him.

For a time, he lived at Naples, but eventually he returned to St. Petersburg and died there in 1852.

== Allusions in other works ==
- The title of de Maistre's book "Voyage Autour de Ma Chambre" is cited in a verse by Carlos Argentino Daneri, a character in Jorge Luis Borges's short story "The Aleph".
- Voyage autour de ma chambre is mentioned in the second sentence of the short story "Honolulu", collected in The Trembling of a Leaf (1921) by W. Somerset Maugham: "The wise traveller travels only in imagination. An old Frenchman (he was really a Savoyard) once wrote a book called Voyage autour de ma Chambre."
- "Voyage Autour de ma Chambre" is mentioned in British author Alain de Botton's book The Art of Travel (2002, ISBN 0-375-42082-7).
- "Voyage Autour de ma Chambre" is mentioned in Danish author Torben Brostrøm's book Litterære bekendelser (2016, ISBN 978-87-02-21152-8).
- "Voyage Autour de ma Chambre" is mentioned in British author Lucy Huskinson's book Architecture and the Mimetic Self (2018, ISBN 978-0415693042)
- The poem "Hai luli" from Les Prisonniers du Caucase was set to music by French composer Pauline Viardot.
- Alphonse de Lamartine writes the poem Le Retour when De Maistre returns to Paris.
- Voyage Autour de ma Chambre inspired Portuguese writer Almeida Garrett to write Viagens na Minha Terra (Travels in my Homeland).
- Xavier de Maistre and his Voyage Autour de ma Chambre are said by the character Brás Cubas to be one of his influences in writing his memoirs, in the novel Memórias Póstumas de Brás Cubas by Brazilian writer Machado de Assis.
- Voyage Autour de ma Chambre is mentioned in D. H. Lawrence's Sons and Lovers: "...She wanted to learn, thinking that if she could read, as Paul said he could read, 'Colomba', or the 'Voyage autour de ma Chambre', the world would have a different face for her and a deepened respect." (Part 2, Chapter 7)
- The short story by Wilkie Collins, "A Terribly Strange Bed," which was first published in Household Words by Charles Dickens in 1852, contains a reference to "Voyage Autour de ma Chambre." During a bout of insomnia, the narrator says that he will inspect the strange room that he is spending the night in.
- The title is echoed in John Mortimer's 1963 autobiographical play A Voyage Round My Father.
- "The Leper from Aosta" heavily inspired Gustaw Herling-Grudziński's work "Wieża" or "Tower".

== Theatre ==
The novel "Voyage Around My Room" was first performed in Zürich in 2013.
