= Catherine Talbot =

English author (1721–1770)

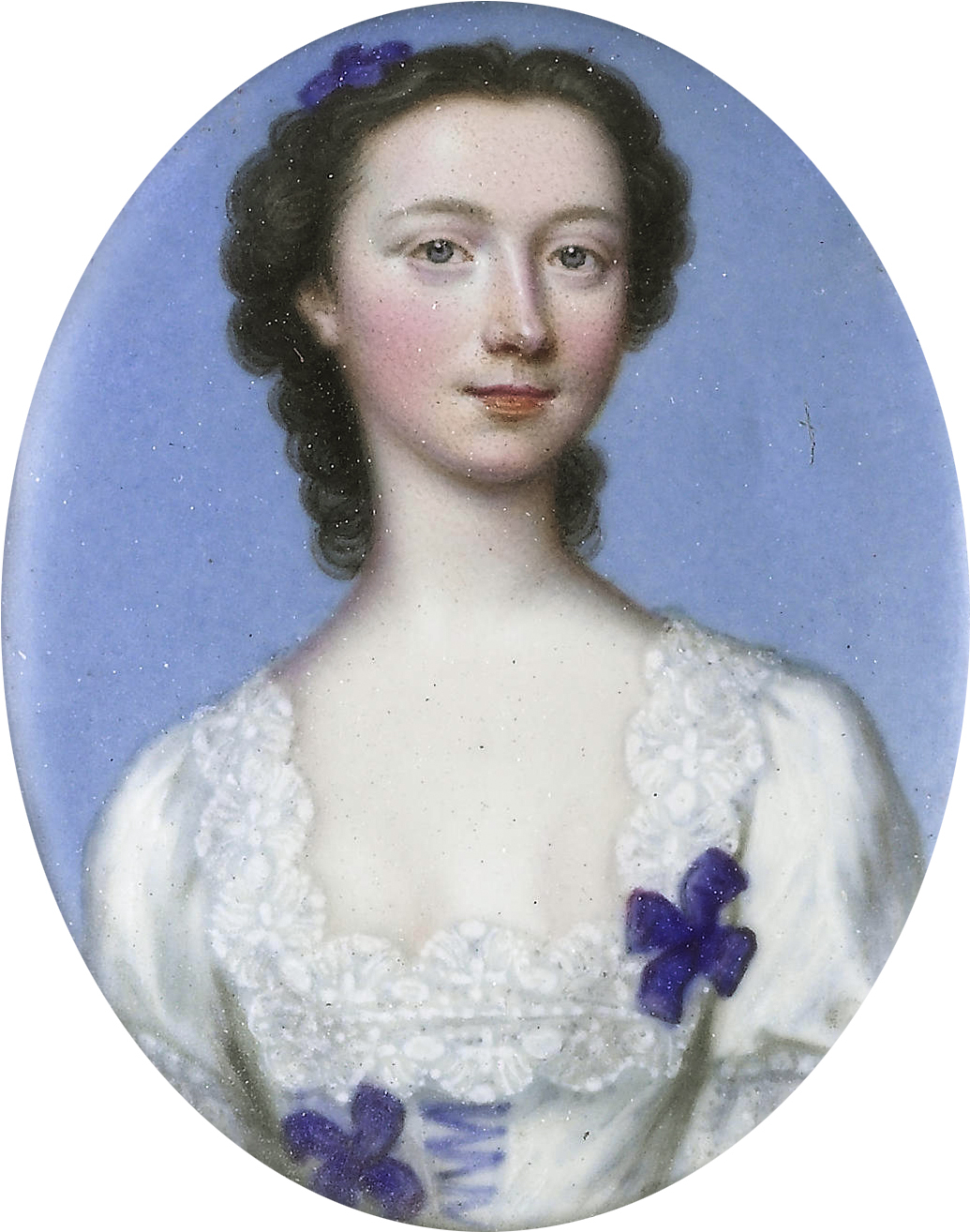
Catherine Talbot (Christian Friedrich Zincke)

Catherine Talbot (May 1721 – 9 January 1770) was an English writer and member of the Blue Stockings Society.

== Life ==
She was the posthumous and only child of Edward Talbot, second son of William Talbot, bishop of Durham, and his wife Mary (died 1784), daughter of George Martyn, prebendary of Lincoln. Her uncle Charles Talbot, another son of the bishop, was Lord Chancellor. Her father, Edward, who was elected fellow of Oriel College, Oxford, and appointed archdeacon of Berkshire in 1717, died on 9 December 1720. At the time of his death Catherine Benson (sister of Martin Benson, bishop of Gloucester) was residing at his house, and on her marriage to Thomas Secker, a protégé of Talbot, in 1725, Mrs. Talbot and Catherine, who were not well-off, went to live with the newly married couple and remained members of the household until Secker's death in 1768.

Catherine's education was superintended by Secker. She became learned in the Scriptures and an accomplished linguist. She also painted in watercolours and read widely. As a child her talent was recognised, for example by Thomas Rundle. February 1741 saw the beginning of her lifelong friendship with Elizabeth Carter; the introduction was by Wright, Miss Talbot's tutor in astronomy. The two ladies carried on a lively and copious correspondence.

As Secker was successively rector of St. James's, Westminster, bishop of Oxford, dean of St. Paul's, and finally in 1758 archbishop of Canterbury, Catherine Talbot frequented the society of her time. She knew among others Bishop Butler, Lord Lyttelton, William Pulteney, earl of Bath, Mrs. Montagu, the Duchess of Somerset, with whom she often stayed at Percy Lodge, and Samuel Richardson. Richardson discussed Sir Charles Grandison with her and Elizabeth Carter, adopted their suggestions, and sent them parts of the novel to read before publication. Catherine Talbot visited Richardson at North End, Hammersmith. She also encouraged Carter to translate Epictetus, and corresponded with her on the subject while the work was in progress.

During the whole period of her residence with him Catherine Talbot was Secker's almoner. In 1760, accompanied by Elizabeth Carter, she went to Bristol for her health. Secker died in 1768, leaving to Mrs. Talbot and her daughter £13,000 in the public funds. The ladies moved from Lambeth Palace to Lower Grosvenor Street. There Catherine died of cancer on 9 January 1770, aged 48. Several poems were written in her praise.

== Works ==
Her health prevented continuous work, but she wrote essays and detached pieces in a ‘green book,’ constantly referred to by her friends. They were unable to persuade her to publish her compositions. She contributed, however, one paper to Samuel Johnson’s The Rambler (No. xxx., 30 June 1750).

Mrs. Talbot put her daughter's manuscripts into Elizabeth Carter's hand, leaving their publication to her discretion. In 1770 Elizabeth Carter published at her own expense Catherine Talbot's Reflections on the Seven Days of the Week, a work that was constantly reprinted. The Reflections are on religious and moral topics. In 1772 another book by Catherine Talbot, Essays on Various Subjects, was published. It contained essays, dialogues, prose pastorals, a fairy tale, imitations of Ossian, allegories, and a few original poems. Between 1772 and 1819 several collected editions of her works appeared. Her correspondence with Elizabeth Carter, published in 1809, shows an interest in public affairs, observation of men and manners, and affection for her friends.
