= William Richards =

William, Bill, or Billy Richards may refer to:

== Sportspeople ==
- Dicky Richards (William Henry Matthews Richards, 1862–1903), South African cricketer
- Billy Richards (footballer, born 1874) (1874–1926), West Bromwich Albion football player
- Billy Richards (footballer, born 1878) (1878–1947), Bury FC football player, see 1903 FA Cup Final
- Billy Richards (footballer, born 1905) (1905–?), Welsh international footballer, played for Wolverhampton Wanderers and Fulham
- Will Richards (footballer) (born 1991), footballer for Shrewsbury Town F.C
- Bill Richards (rugby league), Australian rugby league player
- Billy Richards (rugby union) (c. 1878–c. 1928), Australian rugby union player
- William M. Richards (1873–?), American college football player and coach

== Other people ==
- William Richards (priest) (1643–1705), English clergyman and author
- William Richards (minister) (1749–1818), Welsh Baptist minister
- William Richards (college administrator), president of Orange County Community College, Orange County, NY
- William Richards (missionary) (1793–1847), missionary and politician in Hawaii
- William Richards (politician) (1819–?), political figure in Prince Edward Island
- William A. Richards (1849–1912), American surveyor, rancher and politician, Governor of Wyoming
- William A. Richards (psychologist) (Bill Richards) (born 1940), American clinical psychologist and psychedelic researcher
- William Buell Richards (1815–1889), Canadian judge, Chief Justice of Canada
- William L. Richards (1881–?), Wisconsin State Senator
- William Trost Richards (1833–1905), American landscape artist
- William Westley Richards (1789–1865), English gunmaker
- Bill Richards (musician) (1923–1995), Canadian violinist, composer, arranger, and editor
- G. William Richards (1918–2005), American Latter-day Saint composer and organist
- William Richards (Archdeacon of Berkshire) (1643–1712)
- William Upton Richards (1811–1873), Tractarian priest in the Church of England
