= Arthur Parham =

English Anglican bishop

- Bishop of Reading
- Diocese: Diocese of Oxford
- In office: 1942–1954
- Predecessor: abeyance
- Successor: Eric Knell
- Other posts: Vicar of St Mary's, Reading (1926–1946); Archdeacon of Berkshire (1942–1954)

Orders
- Ordination: 1909 (deacon); 1910 (priest) by John Harmer (deacon)
- Consecration: 1942 by Cosmo Lang

Personal details
- Born: 25 June 1883 Highbury, Middlesex, United Kingdom
- Died: 8 January 1961 (aged 77) Little Wittenham, Berkshire, UK
- Denomination: Anglican
- Parents: Edmund & Ann
- Spouse: Margaret Montagu (m. 1946)
- Children: 2 daughters
- Education: Exeter College, Oxford

Arthur Groom Parham MC (25 June 1883 – 8 January 1961) was an English Anglican bishop who was bishop of Reading (a suffragan bishop in the Diocese of Oxford) from 1942 until 1954.

== Family and education ==
Son of Edmund and Ann, Parham was educated at Magdalen College School, Oxford then Exeter College, Oxford (gaining the degree of Oxford Master of Arts). He trained for the ministry at Leeds Clergy School and was ordained a deacon on Trinity Sunday (6 June) 1909 by John Harmer, Bishop of Rochester, at Rochester Cathedral and a priest in 1910.

== Ministry pre-war ==
Beginning his ministry with a curacy at Bromley, Kent (1909–1912), he was then appointed chaplain and precentor of Christ Church Cathedral and chaplain of Magdalen College, Oxford (all 1912–1921); that period was interrupted with World War I service as a temporary chaplain to the Forces during which he was twice mentioned in despatches and awarded the Military Cross.

== Ministry in Berkshire ==
When peace returned, he became rector of Easthampstead (1921–1926), then vicar of St Mary's, Reading (1926–1946; both in Berkshire), and additionally rural dean of Reading (1934–1942); during this period his became an honorary canon of Christ Church (1934 onwards) and was first elected a proctor in convocation (1935–1954). Remaining, to start with, vicar of Reading, he became also archdeacon of Berkshire and bishop of Reading (a suffragan bishop of the diocese), both from 1942 to 1954. He was ordained and consecrated a bishop by Cosmo Lang, archbishop of Canterbury, at St Paul's Cathedral, on Candlemas (2 February) 1942. In 1946, he both married Margaret Elizabeth Montagu, with whom he had two daughters, and resigned his vicarage (retaining the archdeaconry and suffragan see). He retired in 1954 and continued to serve the Church as an assistant bishop within the Diocese of Oxford; at his death, he lived in Little Wittenham, Berkshire, where he died at home.

Church of England titles
Preceded by Richard Wickham Legg	Archdeacon of Berkshire; 1942–1954	Succeeded by Eric Knell
in abeyance	Bishop of Reading; 1942–1954	Succeeded by Eric Knell
