= Richard Wickham Legg =

The Ven. Richard Wickham Legg (23 July 1867 – 18 January 1952) was the Archdeacon of Berkshire from 1922 until 1942.

Legg was the son of William Legg, sometime Rector of Hawkinge and educated at Harrow, New College, Oxford and Ripon College Cuddesdon. He began his ordained ministry as a curate at Aylesbury, after which he was a lecturer and chaplain at his old theological college. He was the vicar of St John's, Newbury, Berkshire from 1900 to 1912 when he became the vicar of St Mary's, Reading.

Church of England titles
Preceded by William Ducat	Archdeacon of Berkshire; 1922–1942	Succeeded by Arthur Groom Parham
