= Temple West =

British naval officer

Vice-Admiral Temple West
- Born: 1713
- Died: 9 August 1757 (aged 43–44)
- Burial place: St John's, West Wickham, Kent
- Spouse: Frances Balchen
- Children: 3
- Relatives: Richard West (father); Gilbert West (brother); Sir John West (grandson)
- Military career
- Allegiance: Kingdom of Great Britain
- Branch: Royal Navy
- Service years: 1727–1757
- Rank: Vice-Admiral
- Commands: HMS Grampus; HMS Alderney; HMS Deal Castle; HMS Sapphire; HMS Dartmouth; HMS Warwick; HMS St George; HMS Devonshire; Ribadeo Station; Lord Commissioner of the Admiralty
- Conflicts: War of the Austrian Succession; Battle of Toulon; First Battle of Cape Finisterre; Seven Years' War; Battle of Minorca

Vice-Admiral Temple West (1713 – 9 August 1757) was a British naval officer, best known for his role as second-in-command to Admiral John Byng during the Battle of Minorca in 1756.

== Early career ==
West was a younger son of Rev. Dr. Richard West, archdeacon of Berkshire, and his wife Maria Temple, daughter of Sir Richard Temple, 3rd Baronet and sister of the influential Richard Temple, 1st Viscount Cobham and also Hester Grenville, 1st Countess Temple.

His elder brother was the author Gilbert West. and his sister, Mary, married Admiral Alexander Hood, 1st Viscount Bridport.

In 1738, West was given command of Deal Castle, a 24-gun sixth-rate. In 1742, he was made captain of Warwick, a 60-gun fourth-rate. During the Battle of Toulon, Warwick was one of three ships that broke up a Franco-Spanish movement to weather the British line, but did so contrary to orders. He was court-martialed at Deptford on 13 December 1745, found guilty, and dismissed the service, but was reinstated on 12 May 1746 by Order in Council. In 1747, he commanded Devonshire as flag-captain to Vice-Admiral Sir Peter Warren at the Battle of Cape Finisterre.

In 1756/57 he was Flag Officer on HMS Buckingham.

== Battle of Menorca ==
In 1756, West, now a rear-admiral, was appointed second-in-command to Admiral Byng to lead a hastily assembled squadron to the relief of Menorca. West sailed aboard Buckingham, Flag-Captain Michael Everitt, and the fleet saw action on 20 May 1756, the day after their arrival. West had command of the van, which attacked the rear of the French van and drew heavy fire. In the rear, Byng, who had insufficient sail on to promptly come up and support the van, declined to put on further sail, citing the court-martial of Thomas Mathews at the Battle of Toulon. (Mathews had attacked the enemy individually while flying a signal to attack in line of battle, resulting in a confused and disorderly attack.) The French drew off at the end of the day, and the English fleet lacked the weather gage to pursue.

== After Menorca ==
Both Byng and West were recalled from command after the battle, beginning the process which culminated in the court-martial and execution of Byng, for failing to do his duty "to his utmost". West, on the contrary, was received as a hero, and was appointed a Lord Commissioner of the Admiralty on 17 November 1756 and promoted to Vice-Admiral. The fate of his superior greatly affected West, who afterwards declined a command, saying that "although he could answer for his loyalty and good intentions, he could not undertake to be held capitally responsible on all occasions for the correctness of his judgment". He died not long after, on 9 August 1757, and was buried in Westminster Abbey, where there is a handsome monument.

== Family ==
West married Frances Balchen (1710–1793), daughter of Admiral Sir John Balchen, on 6 June 1737. They were the parents of Balchen West (1746–1793) and hence grandparents of:

- Sir Edward West (1782–1828), first Chief Justice of Bombay;
- (John) Martin West (1785–1870), Recorder of Lynn, who married Lady Maria Walpole, (daughter of Horatio Walpole, 2nd Earl of Orford), by whom he had a son, Algernon West. His other son, also Temple West (1739–1783), was father of Sir John West.

Parliament of Great Britain
Preceded by George Grenville; Richard Grenville	Member of Parliament for Buckingham; 1753–1754; With: George Grenville	Succeeded by George Grenville; James Grenville
