= James Randall =

James Randall may refer to:

- James Ryder Randall (1839–1908), American journalist and poet
- James G. Randall (1881–1953), American historian
- Leslie Randall (bishop) (James Leslie Randall, 1828–1922), English bishop
- James K. Randall (1929–2014), American composer
- James Randall (murderer) (born 1954), American criminal
- James Randall (priest), English priest
- Jimmy Randall (1904–?), English professional footballer
- Sap Randall (James Odell Randall, born 1960), American baseball player and coach

== See also ==
- James Randi (1928–2020), American stage magician and scientific sceptic
