= Alfred Pott =

English churchman

- Alfred Pott
- Born: 30 September 1822; West Norwood, London
- Died: 28 February 1908 (aged 85); Chertsey, Surrey

Alfred Pott (30 September 1822 – 28 February 1908) was an English churchman, Archdeacon of Berkshire from 1870 until 1902.

== Life ==
Pott was educated at Eton and Magdalen College, Oxford, where he was president of the Oxford Union. He was ordained Deacon in 1845 and Priest in 1846.

He was Principal of Cuddesdon Theological College from 1854 to 1859.

He was the incumbent at St. Agatha, Brightwell-cum-Sotwell and was the Vicar of Clifton Hampden from 1874 until 1882. He was on the governing body of Abingdon School from 1869 to 1902 and Chairman of the Governors from 1869 to 1900. He was appointed archdeacon of Berkshire in 1870, and resigned in late 1902.

During his retirement Pott revealed in his memoirs that he suffered ill health throughout his life.

Pott married Emily Harriette Gibbs, daughter of Rev. Joseph Gibbs, Vicar of Clifton Hampden. She died at Woodside, Windlesham, Surrey, on 21 January 1903, aged 68. His son Alfred Percivall Pott (ca 1863–1943) was also a clergyman. His daughter, Gladys (1867–1961), was an anti-suffragist and civil servant.

== Notes ==
Church of England titles
Preceded by Leslie Randall	Archdeacon of Berkshire; 1870 –1902	Succeeded by William Ducat
