= John Spry =

John Spry may refer to:

- John Spry (priest), Archdeacon of Berkshire
- Sir John Farley Spry, Chief Justice of Gibraltar
