= John E. Brown =

John E. Brown may refer to:

- John E. Brown (1879–1957), American evangelist, founder of John Brown University
- John Ednie Brown (1848–1899), Scottish author on sylviculture and state conservator of forests
- John Edward Brown (1931–2011), English Anglican bishop
- John Edward "The Body" Brown (1922–2009), American football center and linebacker
- John Evans Brown (1827–1895), American-born member of New Zealand parliament
