= Alan Wilson (bishop) =

Bishop of Buckingham from 2003 to 2024

The Right Reverend Alan Wilson
- Bishop of Buckingham
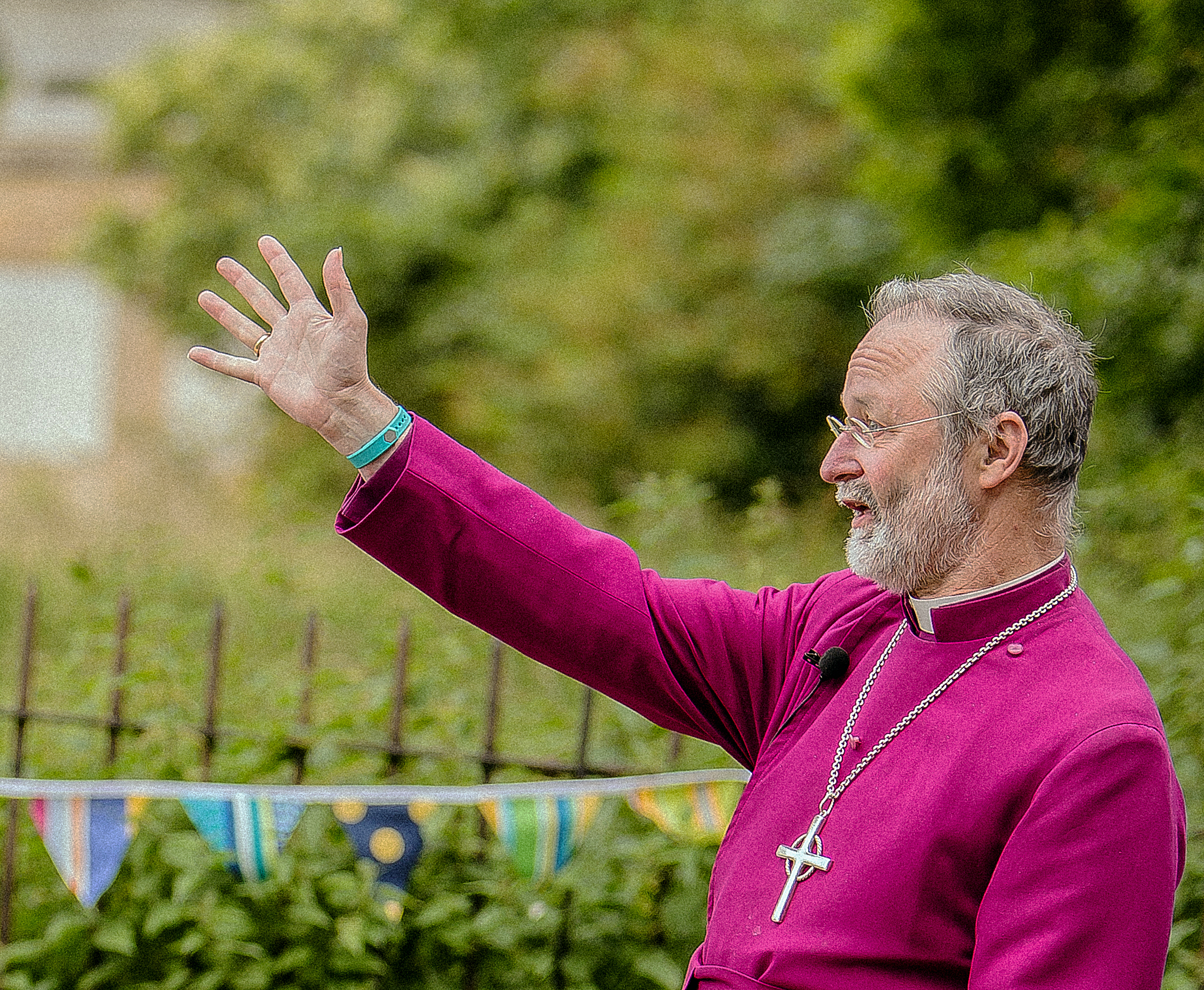
- Wilson in 2016
- Church: Church of England
- Diocese: Oxford
- In office: 2003–2024
- Predecessor: Mike Hill
- Successor: Dave Bull

Orders
- Ordination: 1979 (deacon) by Eric Wild; 1980 (priest) by Patrick Rodger
- Consecration: 9 October 2003 by Rowan Williams

Personal details
- Born: 27 March 1955 Redford Barracks, Edinburgh, Scotland, United Kingdom
- Died: 17 February 2024 (aged 68)
- Denomination: Anglican
- Spouse: (m. 1984)
- Children: 5
- Education: St John's College, Cambridge; Wycliffe Hall, Oxford; Balliol College, Oxford

Alan Thomas Lawrence Wilson (27 March 1955 – 17 February 2024) was a British Anglican bishop. He served as the area Bishop of Buckingham in the Diocese of Oxford from October 2003 until his death in February 2024.

== Early life and education ==
Alan Thomas Lawrence Wilson was born on 27 March 1955 in Redford Barracks in Edinburgh, Scotland. He was educated at Sevenoaks School, then an all-boys private school in Kent. He studied history at St John's College, Cambridge, graduating with a Bachelor of Arts (BA) degree in 1977; as per tradition, this was promoted to a Master of Arts (MA Cantab) degree in 1981. From 1977 to 1979, he trained for ordained ministry at Wycliffe Hall, Oxford.

== Ordained ministry ==
Wilson was made a deacon at Petertide (1 July) 1979 by Eric Wild, Bishop of Reading, at St Peter's, Didcot, and ordained a priest the Petertide following (29 June 1980) by Patrick Rodger, Bishop of Oxford, at Christ Church Cathedral, Oxford. From 1979 to 1981 he was an honorary assistant curate of Eynsham (where he met his future wife) and also held an academic position funded by the University of Oxford. From 1981 to 1982, he was an assistant curate in the same parish, his academic position having ended.

His Doctor of Philosophy (DPhil) degree, for which he studied as a student of Balliol College, Oxford, was awarded in 1989. He had completed his thesis in 1988. The official title of his thesis is "The theology of church and party of some London ritualistic clergy and parishes, 1880–1914, with special reference to the Church Crisis of 1898-1906", although it bears the unofficial title "The authority of church and party among London Anglo-Catholics, 1880–1914, with special reference to the Church Crisis, 1898–1904".

Wilson spent the following years of his ministry in a variety of positions, including as a prison chaplain. He was vicar of St Michaels, Sandhurst, Rural Dean of Sonning and an honorary canon at Christ Church Cathedral, Oxford.

=== Episcopal ministry ===
On 9 October 2003, Wilson was consecrated a bishop by Rowan Williams, Archbishop of Canterbury, at Westminster Abbey. He then became Bishop of Buckingham, an area bishop in the Diocese of Oxford.

=== Views ===
On 11 February 2017, fourteen retired bishops signed an open letter to the then-serving bishops of the Church of England. In an unprecedented move, they expressed their opposition to the House of Bishops' report to General Synod on sexuality, which recommended no change to the church's canons or practices around sexuality. By 13 February, Wilson (the only serving bishop) and nine further retired bishops had added their signatures; on 15 February, the report was rejected by synod.

In 2023, he was one of 44 Church of England bishops who signed an open letter supporting the use of the Prayers of Love and Faith (i.e. blessings for same-sex couples) and called for "Guidance being issued without delay that includes the removal of all restrictions on clergy entering same-sex civil marriages, and on bishops ordaining and licensing such clergy".

== Death ==
Wilson died on 17 February 2024, at the age of 68. He had been married from 1984, and is survived by his wife, Lucy, and five adult children.

== Selected works ==
- Wilson, Alan (2014). More Perfect Union? Understanding Same-sex Christian Marriage. London: Darton, Longman & Todd Ltd. ISBN 978-0232531251.
- Wilson, Alan (with Rosie Harper) (2019), To Heal and Not to Hurt - A fresh approach to safeguarding in the Church. London: Darton, Longman and Todd Ltd. ISBN 9780232533941

== Styles ==
- The Reverend Alan Wilson (1979–1989)
- The Reverend Doctor Alan Wilson (1989–2002)
- The Reverend Canon Doctor Alan Wilson (2002–2003)
- The Right Reverend Doctor Alan Wilson (2003–2024)

== See also ==
- Rosie Harper, chaplain to Wilson

Church of England titles
Preceded by Mike Hill	Bishop of Buckingham; 2003–2024	Succeeded by Vacant
