= Elm Lodge =

House in Reading, Berkshire, United Kingdom

- Interactive map of the Elm Lodge area
- Former names: St Andrew's Home

General information
- Location: Wilton Road; Reading; Berkshire, UK
- Coordinates: 51.4563°N 1.0003°W

Elm Lodge is a Grade II listed building in Reading, Berkshire. The house was originally situated in parkland that stretched from Brock Barracks in the west to Battle Hospital in the east. The park was bordered by the Oxford Road to the north and open land (later the site of Reading F.C.'s Elm Park stadium) to the south.

== History ==
By the early 20th century the house was operating as a children's home under the leadership of The Children's Society. The building was then known as St Andrew's Home for Boys, and was dedicated on 20 November 1901 by Leslie Randall, the Bishop of Reading. The following year, on 14 May, James Herbert Benyon officially opened the home. In 1948 the building's name was shortened to St Andrew's Home, reflecting its change of enrolment policy to include girls. The home closed in 1975.

== Architecture ==
The building is a two-storey ashlar house. The slate roof is hipped and features several corniced chimneys. The façade has three bays, each with sash windows. The porch is positioned centrally and is of Doric order; its original triglyphs and cornice are missing.
