= William Talbot (bishop) =

English Anglican bishop (1658–1730)

The Right Reverend William Talbot
- Bishop of Durham
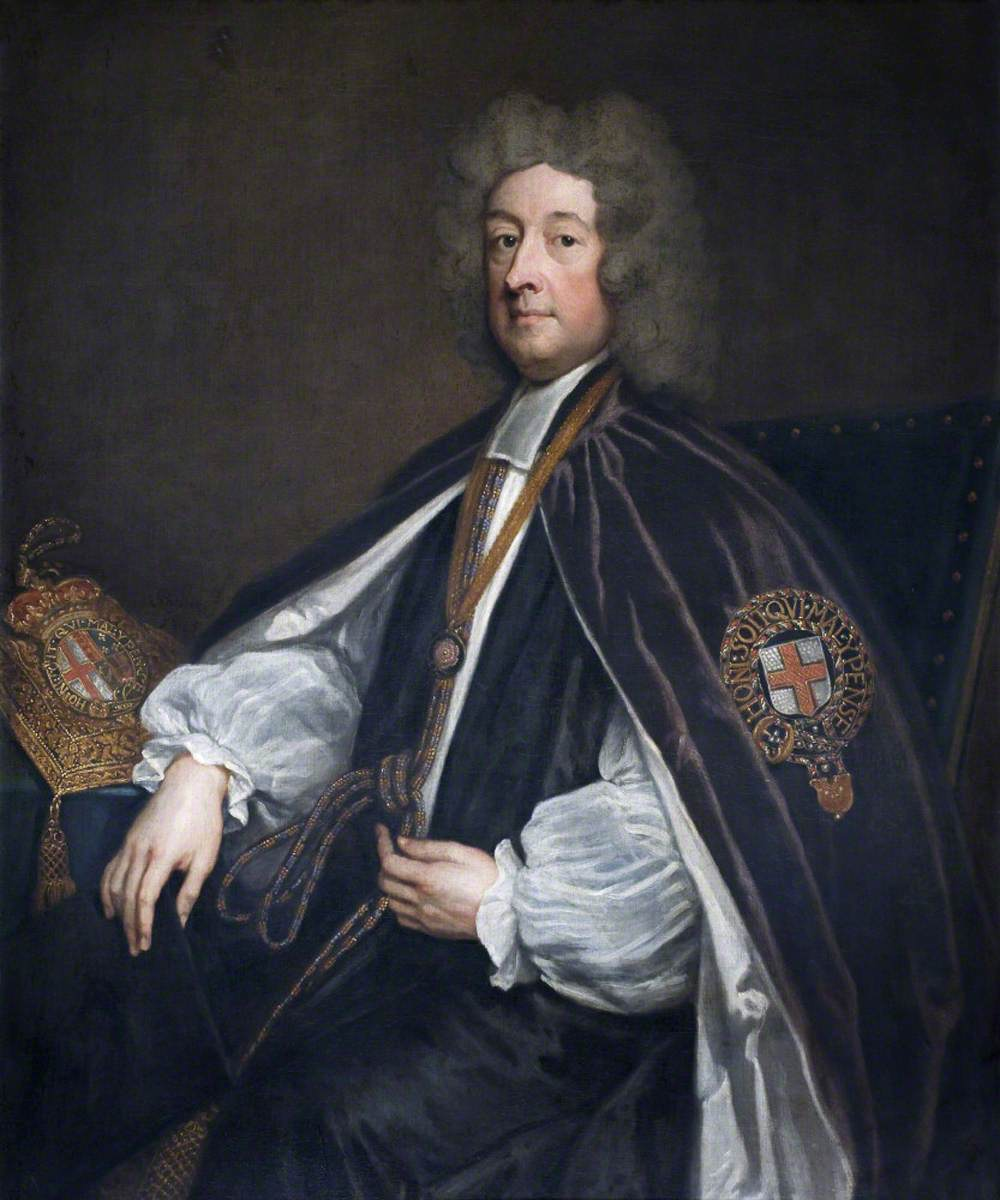
- Portrait by Godfrey Kneller, 1718
- Church: Church of England
- Diocese: Diocese of Durham

Personal details
- Born: 1658 Stourton Castle, Staffordshire
- Died: 10 October 1730 (aged 71–72) Hanover Square, London
- Denomination: Anglicanism
- Education: Oriel College, Oxford (MA)

William Talbot (1658 – 10 October 1730) was an English Anglican bishop. He was Bishop of Oxford from 1699 to 1715, Bishop of Salisbury from 1715 to 1721 and Bishop of Durham from 1721 to 1730.

== Life ==
The son of William Talbot of Lichfield, by his wife Mary, daughter of Thomas Stoughton of Whittington, Worcestershire, he was born at Stourton Castle, Staffordshire, around 1659. On 28 March 1674 he matriculated as a gentleman commoner at Oriel College, Oxford, and graduated B.A. on 16 October 1677, and M.A. on 23 June 1680.

Talbot's first preferment was the rectory of Burghfield, Berkshire (1682), a living in the gift of his kinsman, Charles Talbot, 1st Duke of Shrewsbury. The deanery of Worcester was vacant after the deprivation of George Hickes as a nonjuror, and Shrewsbury's interest secured the appointment of Talbot in April 1691. Hickes drew up a protest (2 May) claiming a "legal right", which he affixed to the entrance to the choir of Worcester Cathedral. John Tillotson then gave Talbot (8 June) a Lambeth degree of D.D.

In 1699 Talbot succeeded John Hough as bishop of Oxford (consecrated 24 September), retaining his deanery in commendam; he had been made D.D. of Oxford on 8 August. In the debate in the House of Lords following the trial (1710) of Henry Sacheverell, he was one of four bishops who spoke for his condemnation. His charge of 1712 maintained the validity of lay baptism against Roger Laurence. In 1718 he was made Dean of the Chapel Royal. On 23 April 1715 he was translated to the see of Salisbury, and resigned the deanery of Worcester.

At Salisbury, through his son Edward Talbot, he was brought into connection with Thomas Rundle, Joseph Butler, and Thomas Secker, all of whom he helped by his patronage. On the death of Nathaniel Crew Talbot was translated (12 October 1721) to the see of Durham. There he became unpopular by promoting (February 1723) a bill empowering bishops to grant new mining leases without the consent of chapters. The bill was emasculated in the House of Commons, but Talbot in course of time managed the chapter through prebendaries of his appointment. He incurred further unpopularity by advancing the fines on his own leases and commending the example to the chapter. His profuse expenditure kept him short of money.

Talbot died in Hanover Square, London, on 10 October 1730, and was buried on 14 October in St. James's, Westminster.

== Works ==
Talbot published single sermons (1691–1717), his speech in the Lords on the Sacheverell case (1710), two charges (1712–17), and a circular to the Salisbury clergy directing collections for Moravians (1716). His volume of Twelve Sermons (1725 and 1731) follows the theology of Samuel Clarke.

== Family ==
Talbot had two sisters, Frances Talbot and Catherine Talbot. His father was a descendant of Sir Gilbert Talbot and Elizabeth Knollys.

He married, first, a daughter of Crispe, an attorney at Chipping Norton, Oxfordshire, who died without issue; secondly, Catharine (d. 23 Nov. 1730), daughter of Alderman Richard King of London, by whom he had eight sons and several daughters. The sons included:

- Charles Talbot, 1st Baron Talbot (c. 1685–1737)
- Edward Talbot (c. 1693–1720), Archdeacon of Berkshire. He married Mary (d. 1784), daughter of George Martyn, prebendary of Lincoln; Catherine Talbot was their daughter.
- Major-General Sherrington Talbot (c. 1699– ?), father of Sir Charles Henry Talbot, 1st Baronet (see Talbot Baronets).

Their daughter, Henrietta Maria, married Charles Trimnell, bishop of Winchester.

== Notes ==
Attribution

- This article incorporates text from a publication now in the public domain: "Talbot, William (1659?-1730)". Dictionary of National Biography. London: Smith, Elder & Co. 1885–1900.

Church of England titles
Preceded by John Hough	Bishop of Oxford; 1699–1715	Succeeded by John Potter
Preceded by Gilbert Burnet	Bishop of Salisbury; 1715–1721	Succeeded by Richard Willis
Preceded by The Lord Crew	Bishop of Durham; 1721–1730	Succeeded by Edward Chandler
Honorary titles
Preceded by The Earl of Scarbrough	Lord Lieutenant of Durham; 1722–1730	Succeeded by Edward Chandler
