= Gladys Pott =

English anti-suffragist and civil servant

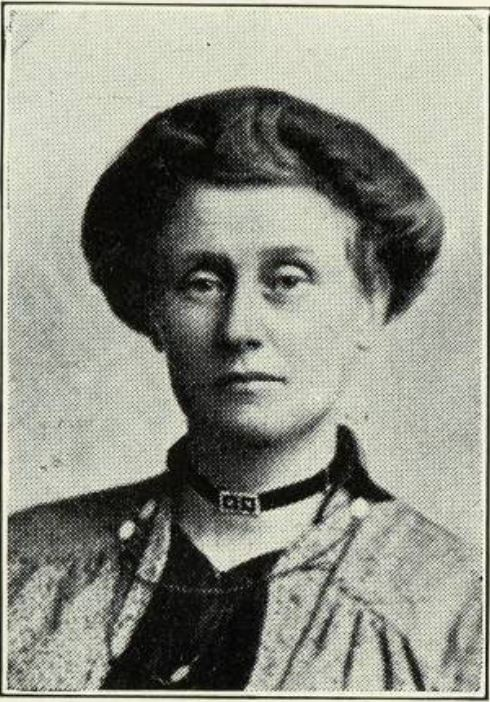
- Born: 1867
- Died: 13 November 1961 (aged 93–94); Clifton Hampden, Oxfordshire England

Gladys Pott (1867 – 13 November 1961) was an English anti-suffragist and civil servant.

== Biography ==
Gladys Pott was born in 1867, the daughter of the Archdeacon of Berkshire, the Venerable Alfred Pott, and his wife, Emily née Gibbs. Little is known about Gladys's formative years, except that she was privately educated.

Pott became a committed anti-suffragist, and in 1908 she was appointed secretary of the Women's National Anti-Suffrage League (north Berkshire branch). Through her organisational ability Berkshire became a "stronghold of female anti-suffragism". In 1910 the league joined with the Men's League for Opposing Woman Suffrage to form the National League for Opposing Woman Suffrage (NLOWS) with Lord Cromer as president; Pott joined the executive committee of the organisation and became its secretary between 1913 and 1914. She and Curzon ran a successful campaign to reduce the impact of the league at the Anglican Church Congress in 1912–1913. In 1912 she wrote The Anti-Suffrage Handbook of Facts, Statistics and Quotations for the Use of Speakers for use by the league's members.

As a committed and devout Christian, Pott took particular umbrage at the launch in 1910 of the Church Suffrage League. According to the historian Julia Bush, Pott "deeply resented this apparent attempt to appropriate religious sanction to one side of the suffrage argument".

Pott was prepared to directly question militant suffragettes, and would attend public meetings of the Women's National Anti-Suffrage League to put questions to the speakers. The suffragette Kate Parry Frye described Pott as "a most harsh, repellent and unpleasing woman. She began by saying we should not get sentiment from her and we did not". Pott wrote regularly for the Anti-Suffrage Review, and also undertook a letter-writing campaign in The Times, particularly in trying to link the non-violent suffragists with the more militant suffragettes, and in identifying financial connections between suffragist and suffragette organisations.

With the outbreak of the First World War Pott stopped her anti-suffrage work to concentrate on work to support the war effort. Along with her friend Dame Meriel Talbot, she worked to organise the Women's Land Army and then, between 1916 and 1919, worked at the Board of Agriculture and Fisheries as an inspector in the women's branch. Between 1920 and 1937 she became the secretary and Chair of the Society for the Oversea Settlement of British Women.

Pott was appointed an OBE in 1923 and a CBE on her retirement in 1937. On 13 November 1961 she died at the age of 94 at her home in Clifton Hampden, Oxfordshire.

== Sources ==
- Bush, Julia (2007). Women Against the Vote: Female Anti-Suffragism in Britain. Oxford: Oxford University Press. ISBN 978-0-19-924877-3.
- Crawford, Elizabeth, ed. (2013). Campaigning for the Vote: Kate Parry Frye's Suffrage Diary. London: Francis Boutle. ISBN 978-1-9034-2775-0.
- Davson, Margot (17 November 1961). "Miss Gladys Pott". The Times. p. 21.
- Harrison, Brian (2012). Separate Spheres: The Opposition to Women's Suffrage in Britain. Abingdon, Oxon: Routledge. ISBN 978-0-415-62336-0.
- "Miss Gladys Pott". The Times. 14 November 1961. p. 15.
- Pott, Gladys (8 March 1912). "Constitutional Suffragists and Militants". The Times. p. 7.
- Pott, Gladys (8 June 1914). "Position of Constitutional Suffragists". The Times. p. 48.
- Pugh, Martin (2004). "Pott, Gladys Sydney (1867–1961)". Oxford Dictionary of National Biography (online ed.). Oxford University Press. doi:10.1093/ref:odnb/41259. (Subscription, Wikipedia Library access or UK public library membership required.)
