= Eric Knell =

English bishop (1903–1987)

Eric Henry Knell (1 April 1903 – January 1987) was the Bishop of Reading from 1954 until 1972.

Knell was educated at Trinity College, Oxford and ordained in 1929. Beginning his ministry with a curacy at St Barnabas, Southfields he was successively: Domestic Chaplain to the Bishop of Lincoln; Priest in charge of the Trinity College, Oxford, Mission in Stratford; Vicar of Emmanuel, Forest Gate, then Christ Church, Reading; and finally, before his appointment to the episcopate, Archdeacon of Berkshire. In 1972 he retired to Lingfield, Surrey and continued to serve the Church as an Assistant Bishop within the Diocese of Oxford.

Church of England titles
Preceded by Arthur Parham	Bishop of Reading; 1954–1972	Succeeded by Eric Wild
