= John Spry (priest) =

British priest (1690–1763)

The Venerable John Spry, BD (Exeter 1690 – West Hendred 1763) of Lincoln College, Oxford was Archdeacon of Berkshire from his collation on 2 January 1747 until his death on 21 October 1763.

Church of England titles
Preceded by Samuel Knight	Archdeacon of Berkshire; 1746 –1763	Succeeded by William Dodwell
