= Edward Chandler (bishop) =

British bishop

The Right Reverend Edward Chandler
- Bishop of Durham
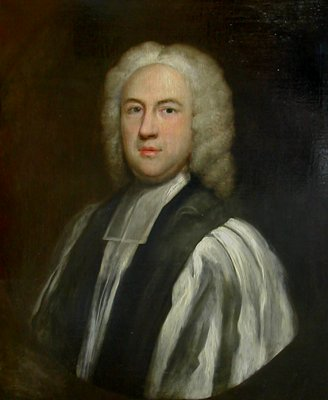
- In office: 1730–1750

Orders
- Ordination: 1693
- Consecration: 17 November 1717 by William Wake

Personal details
- Born: c. 1668
- Died: 20 July 1750 (aged approximately 80–81)
- Denomination: Anglican
- Education: Trinity College Dublin; Emmanuel College, Cambridge

Edward Chandler (1666 – 20 July 1750) was the Bishop of Durham, and resided at Durham Castle.

== Life ==
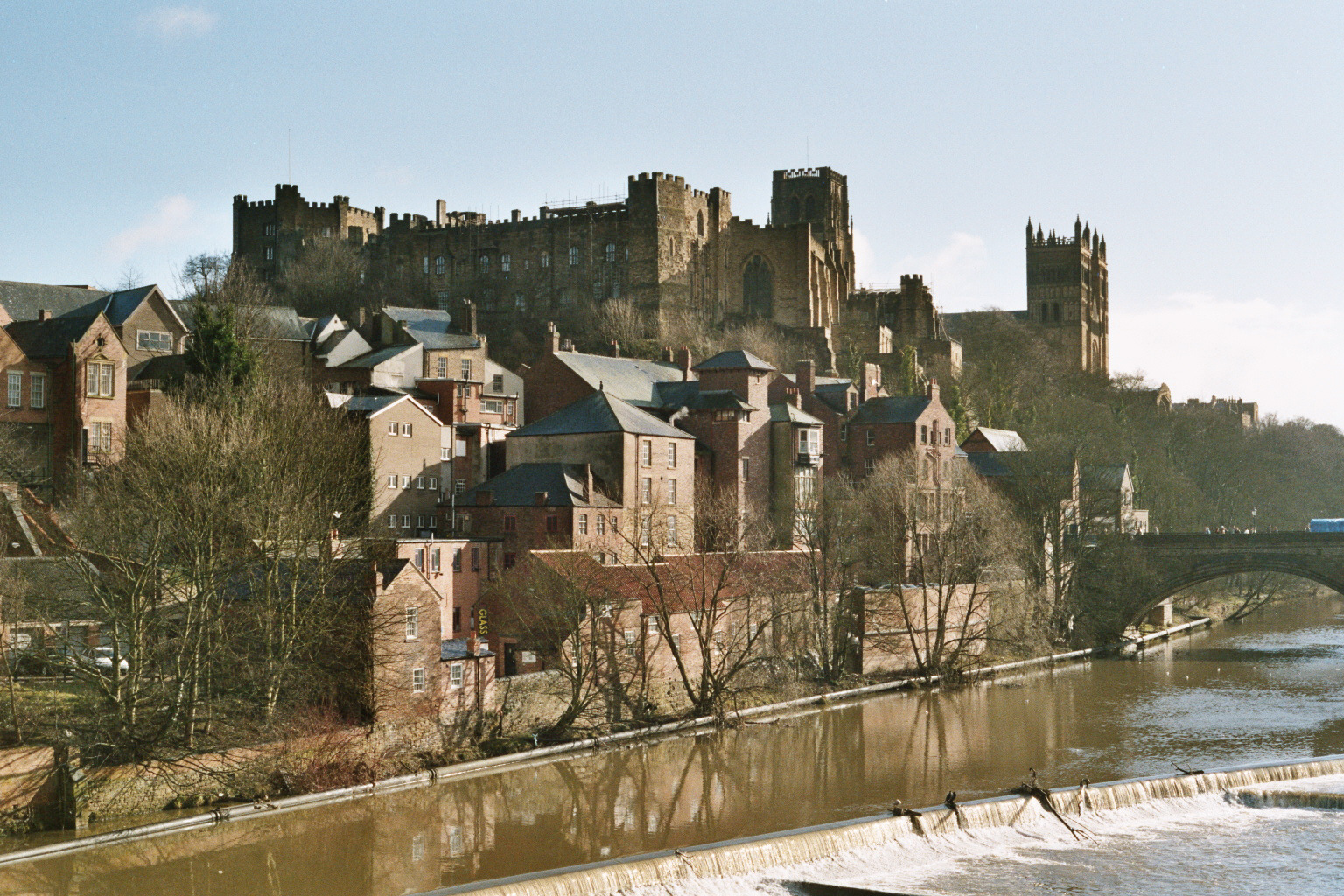
Durham Castle, seat of the Bishop of Durham

He was born in Dublin and educated at Trinity College there, graduating BA in 1686. He was incorporated at Emmanuel College, Cambridge. Chandler was ordained priest, and appointed chaplain to William Lloyd, Bishop of Lichfield and Coventry (and later Bishop of Worcester). In 1697, he became prebendary of Lichfield; became a Doctor of Divinity (DD) in 1701, and in 1703 received the stall in Salisbury vacant by the death of Lancelot Addison. In 1706, he became prebendary of Worcester. Elected as Bishop of Lichfield and Coventry, he was consecrated at Lichfield Cathedral on 17 November 1717. In 1730, he was translated to become Bishop of Durham upon the confirmation of his election on 21 November. He held the position of Lord Lieutenant of Durham from 11 December 1730 to 20 July 1750. Chandler was a man of more learning than capacity.

He gained some reputation by A Defence of Christianity from the Prophecies, &c. (1725), in answer to Collins's well-known ‘Grounds and Reasons of the Christian Religion.’ - Collins having replied in his ‘Scheme of Literal Prophecy.’ Chandler published in 1728 ‘A Vindication of the “Defence of Christianity.” The main point at issue was the date of the book of Daniel, in regard to which Collins had anticipated the views of some modern critics. He also published eight sermons, a ‘Chronological Dissertation.' prefixed to R. Arnald’s ‘Commentary on Ecclesiasticus ’ (17 48) [see Arnald, Richard], and a short preface to Cudworth’s ‘Treatise on Immutable Morality’ when first published in 1731. He died, after a long illness, in London on 20 July 1750, and was buried at Farnham Royal.

Chandler was accused of having given £9,000 for the see of Durham. King mentions him as one of the prelates who died ‘shamefull rich.’ On the other hand, it is said that he gave £50 to the living of Monkwearmouth, £200 towards a house fiat the minister of Stockton, £2,000 for the benefit of priests' widows in his diocese, and that he never sold any of his patent offices.

== Family ==
He married Barbara, eldest daughter of Humphrey Briggs, and had by her two sons and three daughters. He was the father of Catherine Chandler, who married Wadham Wyndham, of Eversley in Hampshire.

Church of England titles
Preceded by John Hough	Bishop of Lichfield and Coventry; 1717–1730	Succeeded by Richard Smalbroke
Preceded by William Talbot	Bishop of Durham; 1730–1750	Succeeded by Joseph Butler
Honorary titles
Preceded by William Talbot	Lord Lieutenant of Durham; 1730–1750	Vacant Title next held by Henry Vane
