= Richard Smalbroke =

English churchman (1672–1749)

The Right Reverend Richard Smalbroke
- Bishop of Lichfield and Coventry
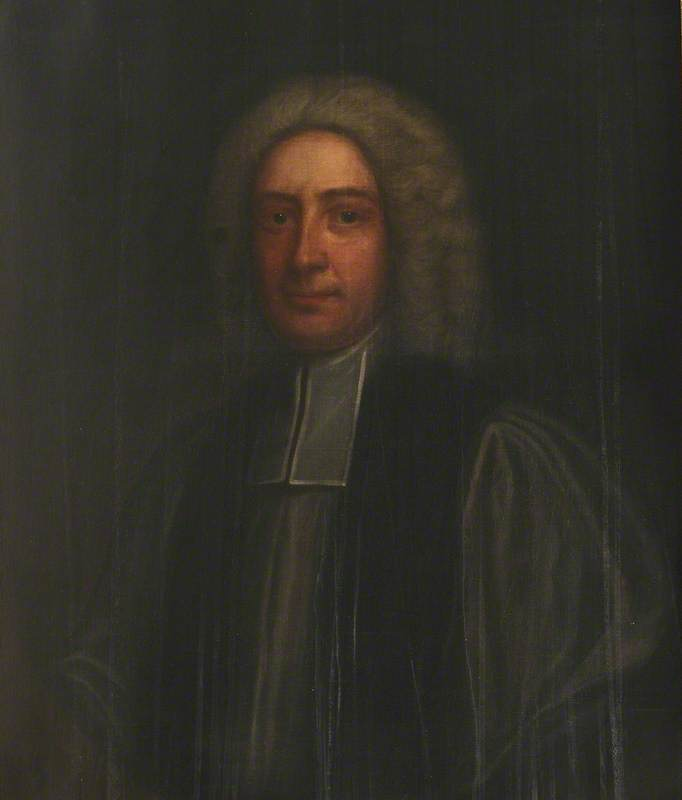
- Diocese: Diocese of Lichfield and Coventry
- In office: 1731–1749
- Predecessor: Edward Chandler
- Successor: Frederick Cornwallis
- Other post: Bishop of St David's (1724–1731)

Orders
- Consecration: 2 February 1724 by William Wake

Personal details
- Born: baptized 3 November 1672
- Died: 22 December 1749 (aged 77)
- Buried: Lichfield Cathedral
- Denomination: Anglican
- Education: Trinity College, Oxford; Magdalen College, Oxford

Richard Smallbrooke (1672 – 22 December 1749) was an English churchman, Bishop of St David's and then of Lichfield and Coventry.

== Life ==
The son of Samuel Smallbrooke (buried 23 May 1701) of Rowington, Warwickshire, by his wife Elizabeth (died 5 May 1722), he was born at 19 High Street, Birmingham. He matriculated at Trinity College, Oxford, on 15 June 1688, aged 15; and was elected demy of Magdalen College in the so-called "golden election" of 1689. He graduated B.A. 1692; M.A. 26 January 1694–5; was elected fellow 1698, and became B.D. on 27 January 1707, and D.D. 1708. In 1709 he was appointed chaplain to Thomas Tenison, Archbishop of Canterbury, who gave him (1709) the rectory of Hadleigh, Suffolk; this he held till 1712. He was canon of Hereford Cathedral 1710; vicar of Lugwardine, Herefordshire, 1711; treasurer of Llandaff, 1712, the last to hold that office; and rector of Withington, Gloucestershire, 1716.

In 1723 he was elected, and in 1724 consecrated, to the see of St Davids. He was an active prelate, enforced the reading of the Athanasian Creed, and is said to have learned the Welsh language sufficiently to be able to officiate in it. In a charge delivered in August 1728 he commended the treatise on the authority of Scripture by Faustus Socinus; with the result that this work was translated into English by an Anglican clergyman, Edward Coombe, and published in 1731 with a dedication to Queen Caroline of Ansbach.

In 1731 Smalbroke was translated to the diocese of Lichfield and Coventry. Two years later he contributed to the new buildings of Magdalen College. Samuel Pegge the elder accused him of filling the church at Lichfield with his relations. He died on 22 December 1749, and was buried in Lichfield Cathedral.

A portrait, painted by T. Murray, was engraved by George Vertue in 1733.

== Works ==
Smalbrooke printed in 1706 a university sermon against the view of Henry Dodwell the elder that immortality is conferred by baptism. In 1711 he entered the lists against William Whiston, criticising (1714) Whiston's attempt to place the Clementine literature on a level with the New Testament, and treating (1720) the Arian worship of our Lord as an act of idolatry.

In a letter to Richard Bentley (1722) he contributed to the discussion of the authenticity of 1 John v. 7 and the Complutensian New Testament.

Thomas Woolston dedicated to Smalbroke his third Discourse (1728) on the miracles of Christ. Thus challenged, he published an elaborate examination of Woolston's argument. He began by applauding the prosecution of the author he was confuting; Daniel Waterland came in 1730 to his defence. He calculated the mercy which expelled six thousand demons ("legion") from one man, and sent only three apiece into "each hog". In passing he attacked the Quakers, whom Woolston admired.

His charge of 1735 spoke of "extraordinary local efforts to spread popery". In 1744 he charged against Methodists, anticipating George Lavington by his claim that "these new itinerants copy the popish pattern".

Besides sermons and charges, Smalbroke published:

- Reflections on Mr. Whiston's Conduct, 1711, (anon.)
- The New Arian Reproved: or a Vindication of some Reflections, 1711.
- The Pretended Authority of the Clementine Constitutions confuted, 1714.
- Idolatry charged upon Arianism, 1720.
- An Enquiry into the Authority of the … Complutensian Edition of the New Testament, 1722; reprinted in Somers' Tracts, 1809, xiii; and in Thomas Burgess's Selection of Tracts … on 1 John v. 7, 1824.
- A Vindication of the Miracles of our Blessed Saviour, 1729–1731, 2 vols.; for Quaker criticisms of the second volume, see Joseph Smith's Bibliotheca Anti-Quakeriana, 1873, pp. 398 sq.
- Some Account of … John Hough … Bishop of Worcester, 1743, (anon.)
- Some Account of … Edmund Gibson … Bishop of London,’1749, (anon.)

His politics are attacked in Remarks on Two Charges … by a Friend to Truth and Liberty, 1738, signed at the end A Revolutional Tory, and ascribed (improbably) to Josiah Owen.

Select sermons:

- The Reverence due to the House of God. A Sermon Preach'd in the Cathedral-church of Landaff, July 2d, 1721
- The doctrine of an universal judgment asserted. In a sermon preach'd before the University, at St. Mary's in Oxford, June 9th, 1706. in which the ... ... are consider'd.

== Family ==
Smalbroke married a sister of Richard Brooks, M.D., and left three sons and four daughters. The last of his descendants was his son Richard Smalbroke, D.C.L., of All Souls' College, Oxford, who died on 8 May 1805, aged 89, having been chancellor of the diocese of Lichfield and Coventry for sixty-four years. Thomas Smalbroke, a Socinian writer in 1687, was probably related to the bishop.

Church of England titles
Preceded by Adam Ottley	Bishop of St David's; 1724–1731	Succeeded by Elias Sydall
Preceded by Edward Chandler	Bishop of Lichfield and Coventry; 1731–1749	Succeeded by Frederick Cornwallis
