= Edward Talbot (priest) =

Edward Talbot (died 1720) was the Archdeacon of Berkshire from 13 May 1717 until 9 December 1720.

The son of Bishop William Talbot, he was born in Worcester in 1693 and educated at Oriel College, Oxford. He was rector of East Hendred from 1717; and treasurer of Sarum from 1718.

Church of England titles
Preceded by Richard West	Archdeacon of Berkshire; 1717 – 1720	Succeeded by Martin Benson
