= John Mozley =

Anglican priest, theologian, and academic

John Kenneth Mozley (8 January 1883 – 23 November 1946), also known as J. K. Mozley, was an English Anglican priest, theologian, and academic. Among other appointments, he was a Fellow and later Dean of Pembroke College, Cambridge from 1909 to 1919, the Principal of the Leeds Clergy School from 1920 to 1925, lecturer of Leeds Parish Church from 1920 to 1930 and 1945 to 1946, and Canon Chancellor of St Paul's Cathedral from 1930 to 1941.

== Selected works ==
- Mozley, John Kenneth (1915). The Doctrine of the Atonement. London: Duckworth.
- Mozley, J. K. (1926). The Impassibility of God: A Survey Of Christian Thought. Cambridge: Cambridge University Press.
- Mozley, J. K. (1928). The Doctrine of God / Three Lectures. London: Society for Promoting Christian Knowledge.
- Mozley, J. K. (1931). The Beginnings of Christian Theology. Cambridge: Cambridge University Press.
- Mozley, J. K. (1951). Some Tendencies In British Theology- From The Publication Of Lux Mundi To The Present Day. London: Society for Promoting Christian Knowledge.
