= John Ryves =

The Ven John Ryves (1593- 1665) was Archdeacon of Berkshire from 1634 until his death.

He became Rector of Tarrant Gunville in 1620; Canon of Sarum in 1625; Rector of North Moreton in 1634; Rector of Manston in 1635; and Canon of Winchester in 1660.

He died on 19 August 1665.

Church of England titles
Preceded by Edward D'Avenant	Archdeacon of Berkshire; 1634 –1655	Succeeded by Peter Mews
