= Raymond Birt =

The Venerable William Raymond Birt (25 August 1911 – 11 March 2002) was the Archdeacon of Berkshire from 1973 until 1978.

Birt was educated at Christ's Hospital. His first job was as a schoolmaster at Trent College. Later he was a sub-editor at the Daily Sketch and then assistant editor of Play Rights Publications. He served in the war of 1939 to 1945 as a Major in the 22nd Dragoons, during which he was mentioned in despatches. When peace returned he was the editor of Winchester Publications and then Country Life Books. In 1956 he entered Ely Theological College to prepare for ordination. He was a curate at Caversham until 1959 after which he was Vicar of St George, Newbury, Berkshire. He was Rector of West Woodhay from 1971 to 1978; and Priest in charge of Hamstead Marshall until 1981. From 1986, he was title as an archdeacon emeritus.

Church of England titles
Preceded by Eric Wild	Archdeacon of Berkshire; 1973–1978	Succeeded by John Brown
