= David Griffiths (archdeacon of Berkshire) =

David Nigel Griffiths FSA (29 October 1927 – 13 February 2012) was the Archdeacon of Berkshire from 1987 to 1992.

Father of three and husband to Joan Griffiths, David Griffiths was educated at King Edward's School, Bath, and Worcester College, Oxford. After an earlier career as an economist and having found limited success, he changed career course and was ordained in 1958. He was initially a curate at St Matthew's Church, Northampton. He was on the staff at SPCK from 1961 to 1967 after which he was Rector of the Minster Parishes in Lincoln and Vice-Chancellor and Librarian of Lincoln Cathedral. From 1973 to 1987 he was Rector of Windsor and for part of that time Rural Dean of Maidenhead.

Throughout his working life he also served the British Reserve Forces: firstly the Royal Marines Forces Volunteer Reserve; later as a Chaplain in the RNR; and after receiving the Reserve Decoration the Irish Guards.

Church of England titles
Preceded by John Brown	Archdeacon of Berkshire; 1987–1992	Succeeded by Mike Hill
