= Reading Nunnery =

Nunnery in Berkshire, England

Coordinates: 51.454500°N 0.973690°W

Reading Nunnery was a nunnery in Berkshire, England that existed during the Anglo-Saxon period.

It was established in 979. The site is now occupied by St Mary's Church.
