= James Randall (priest) =

The Ven. James Randall (born in Winchester 19 March 1790 and died in Binfield 19 November 1882) was the Archdeacon of Berkshire from 1855 until his resignation in 1869.

Randall was educated at Rugby School and Trinity College, Oxford, of which he then became a Fellow. He was Rector of All Saints, Binfield from 1831 to 1859; Archdeacon of Berkshire from 1855 to 1869; and a Canon of Bristol from 1867 to 1875. The chancel at Binfield has been restored in his memory.

His eldest son Richard was Dean of Chichester from 1892 to 1902; and another son Leslie was the inaugural Bishop of Reading. from 1889 until 1908.

Church of England titles
Preceded by Edward Berens	Archdeacon of Berkshire; 1855 –1869	Succeeded by Alfred Pott
