= Edward Berens =

The Ven Edward Berens, a Fellow of Oriel College, Oxford, and son in law of the Bishop of Exeter, was Archdeacon of Berkshire from 1832 until 1855.

Church of England titles
| Preceded by John Fisher | Archdeacon of Berkshire; 1832 –1855 | Succeeded by James Randall |
