= William Richards (Archdeacon of Berkshire) =

The Ven William Richards (1643–1712) was Archdeacon of Berkshire from 1689 until 1698.

He matriculated from All Souls' College, Oxford in 1660; and became its Chaplain. He was Rector of Heythrop from 1675; and Vicar of St Giles' Church, Reading from 1678.

He died on 4 October 1712.

Church of England titles
Preceded by John Sharp	Archdeacon of Berkshire; 1689 –1698	Succeeded by Jonas Proast
