= Samuel Knight (priest) =

English clergyman and antiquary

Samuel Knight (1675–1746) was an English clergyman and antiquary.

== Life ==
He was born in London the son of John Knight, a mercer, and attended St Paul's School, London and Trinity College, Cambridge (BA 1702, MA 1706), and received a Cambridge DD in 1706. He was ordained in 1704 and served as curate of Northwold, Norfolk. He then became chaplain to the Earl of Orford, who presented him to the rectory of Burrough Green and vicarage of Chippenham in Cambridgeshire in 1707. In 1714 he was appointed to a Prebendary of Ely cathedral by Bishop John Moore and shortly thereafter to the rectory of Bluntisham, Huntingdonshire, He held Burrough Green and Bluntisham until his death.

In 1717 he married Hannah (d. 1719), the daughter of Talbot Pepys of Impington, Cambridgeshire.

He was appointed chaplain to King George II in February 1731 and was promoted to be Archdeacon of Berkshire in 1746 by Thomas Sherlock, bishop of Salisbury. He was installed as a prebendary of Lincoln in 1742.

At Bluntisham Knight built himself an 'excellent house, and laid out a great deal of money in gardens about it'. He died on 10 December 1746 and was buried in Bluntisham Church, where a white marble monument was erected with an inscription by his friend Edmund Castle. His son Samuel(d. 1790) followed his father to Cambridge and into the church. In 1766 he purchased an estate in Milton, Cambridgeshire, becoming rector there a decade later.

According to William Cole, who lived in Milton in retirement and knew Knight's son, Knight was 'a very black and thin man, and had much the look of a Frenchman'.

== Works ==
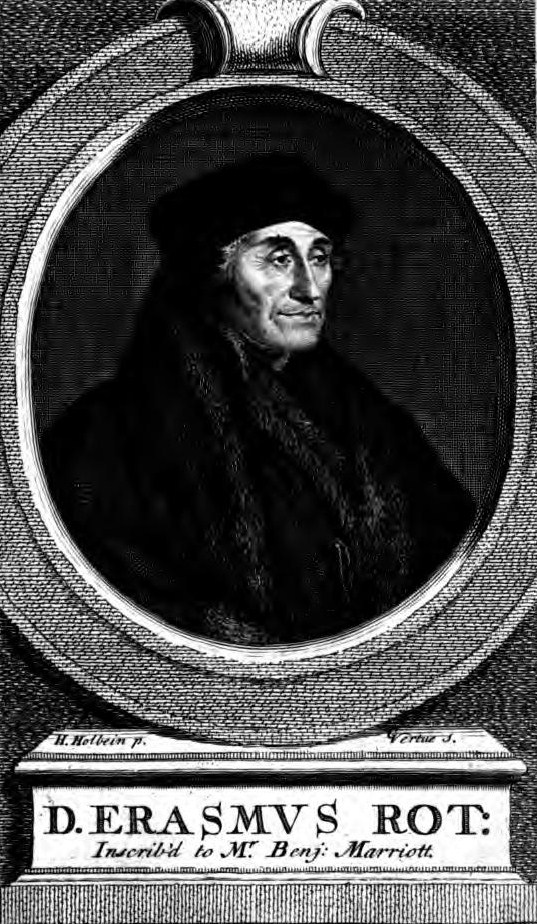
Engraving of Erasmus, by George Vertue, from Knight's Life

According to Cole, Knight was raised as a dissenter and a strong Protestant bias is certainly shown in his works:

- The Life of Dr. John Colet, Dean of St. Paul's, London, 1724
- The Life of Erasmus, Cambridge, 1726

In his biography of Erasmus, Knight argues, like many contemporary Protestants, that Erasmus was truly a Protestant at heart but did not fully express this during his lifetime, claiming that he was 'self-evidently a latitudinarian, and that he gave birth to that sect of men'. The full title of the work - 'More Particularly that Part of it which He Spent in England, Wherein an Account is Given of His Learned Friends, and the State of Religion and Learning at that Time in Both Our Universities' - underlines the focus of the biography on Erasmus' friends in England and English universities. Both works were dedicated to Spencer Compton, speaker of the House of Commons He corresponded with Browne Willis in order to provide him with information on Ely Cathedral for Willis' publication Survey of Lincoln, Ely, Oxford, and Peterborough Cathedrals (1730).
