= Thomas Bedford (theologian) =

- Education: Queens' College, Cambridge
- Occupation: Theologian

Thomas Bedford (fl. 1650), theologian, was prominent in religious controversy between 1620 and 1650, but little is known of his personal history. He was educated at Queens' College, Cambridge, took degrees in arts, and afterwards proceeded B.D. In a letter to Baxter (1650) he says that "he sat at the feet of Bishop Davenant", who was Margaret Professor of Divinity from 1609 to 1621, and Master of Queens from 1614 to 1621. Davenant's successor in the professorship was Dr. Samuel Ward, and from these two Bedford affirms that his own theology was mainly derived. A Latin letter from Davenant to Ward on baptismal regeneration was copied by Bedford, and afterwards published by him, at Ussher's suggestion, as a preface to his thesis for the degree of B.D. held before Dr. Ward.

In the above-mentioned letter to Baxter, Bedford explains that he was convinced of "the efficacy of the sacrament to the elect" by reading a book of Dr. Burges. This letter was written because Baxter had appended to his Plain Scripture Proof of Infants' Church Membership a refutation of what he considered Bedford's erroneous view of baptism, and Bedford's object was to show that their tenets were fundamentally the same. This Baxter admitted in a reply called A friendly Accommodation with Mr. Bedford (1656).

In 1647 Bedford published an examination of antinomianism, the substance of which was taken from lectures he had given in the chapel of St. Antholine's parish, London. He received the rectorship of St Martin Outwich in the city of London some short time before 1649, for in that year he dedicated his Sacramental Instructions to the congregation as his "first-fruits" to them; and Thomas Pierce, the former rector, had been sequestrated a little before. How long Bedford continued as rector is not certain, but Matthew Smalwood was appointed previously to the Restoration (v. Newcourt, '"Rep".' i. 420).

The only political sentiment Bedford shows is when, in his Examination of the Compassionate Samaritan, he urges the right and duty of the civil power to punish for heretical opinions. His theological writings are marked by a temperance alien to his time, and show an extensive reading, especially in the fathers of the church and in the continental theology of his time.

== Works ==
1. The Sinne unto Death, 1621.
2. A Treatise of the Sacrament, 1638.
3. Examination of some of the Chief Points of Antinomianism, and appended to it An Examination of a Pamphlet entitled "The Compassionate Samaritan," 1647.
4. Some Sacramental Instructions, 1649.
5. Vindiciæ Gratiæ Sacramentalis, 1650. (Note: Davenant's Baptismal Regeneration, preface to Eng. trans.) (Note: Baxter's Works) (Note: Watt's Bibl. British) (Note: British Museum Catalogue)
