= Richard West (priest) =

English churchman and academic

Richard West (1670?–1716) was an English churchman and academic, and was archdeacon of Berkshire from 1710.

== Life ==
He was born at Creaton, Northamptonshire, and educated at Uppingham School. He matriculated at St John's College, Cambridge, in 1688; then moved to Merton College, Oxford, in March 1689. He graduated B.A. in 1691, and M.A. in 1694; and was a Fellow of Magdalen College from 1697 to 1708. He received the Lambeth degree of D.D. in 1708.

West served as chaplain to Gilbert Burnet. He was vicar of Inglesham from 1702, and canon of Winchester Cathedral from 1706. He became archdeacon of Berkshire in 1710, and was rector of East Hendred, from 1713.

== Works ==
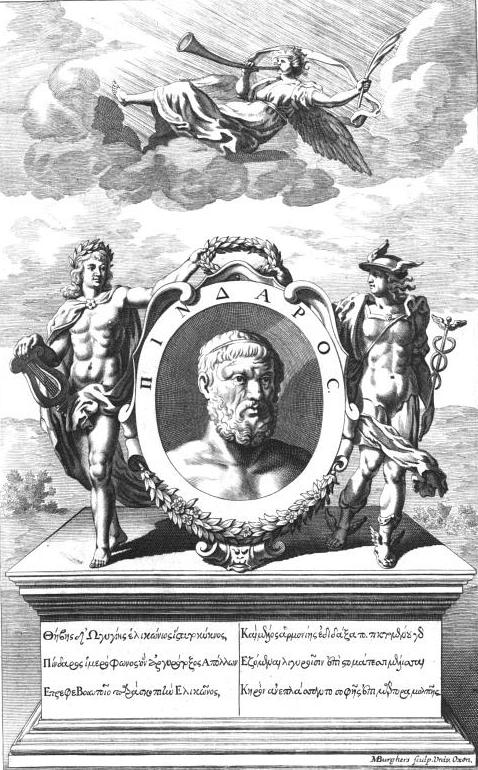
Frontispiece by Michael Burgers of the West and Welsted 1697 edition of Pindar. It included commentaries from Nicolas Lesueur and Erasmus Schmid, followed Schmid's Latin text, and included the paraphrase of Jean Benoît.

West published editions of Pindar (1697) (with Robert Welsted) and Theocritus (1699). A sermon of 1700 for the Sons of the Clergy was printed.

The tract The True Character of a Churchman was printed under West's name in the Somers Tracts; it was a product of the debate over "occasional conformity" of religious dissenters, and in it West argued for religious tolerance, in defence of Burnet. At the time of its appearance it was attributed by some to William Lloyd the bishop of Worcester, who made political use of it in Worcestershire against the Tory Sir John Pakington, 4th Baronet, in 1702. Lloyd denied the authorship, in the course of a parliamentary complaint brought by Pakington. West at this time crossed swords in pamphleteering with Henry Sacheverell, whose The character of a Low-Church-man was a reply to West, at the period when High Church and latitudinarian (Latitude-men) were emerging concepts. Sacheverell wrote of latitude that it allowed interpretation of each of the 39 Articles in 39 ways. West came back implying that the Oxford High Church side objecting to that latitude were Calvinists.

In January 1710 the Winchester MPs Lord William Powlett and George Rodney Brydges together organised support in Parliament, to thank West for a sermon in which he had stated that in the English Civil War the faults were on both sides. It had proved controversial in its views (pan-Protestant, Whig, and in favour of continuing the War of the Spanish Succession), and required a vote in Parliament before it was printed. J. P. Kenyon writes that West's sermon was in fact moderate in its Whiggism, in comparison with that of William Stephens on the same occasion ten years before, but the vote on it, at 124 to 105, was close. Despite his reputation as an intemperate Whig who had defended the execution of Charles I, West continued to preach on public occasions.

== Family ==
West married Maria, eldest daughter of Sir Richard Temple, 3rd Baronet. Temple West was their son, as was Gilbert West (1703–1756), known as a translator. Their daughter Mary married Alexander Hood, 1st Viscount Bridport.
