= Eric Wild =

Eric Wild (6 November 1914 – 10 August 1991) was Bishop of Reading from 1972 to 1982.

Educated at Manchester Grammar School and Keble College, Oxford, he was ordained in 1938. His first post was as a Curate at St Anne, Stanley, Liverpool. After World War II service with the RNVR his subsequent experience included incumbencies in Wigan and Hindley, Greater Manchester followed by posts as Director of Religious Education for the Diocese of Peterborough and (his final post before appointment to the episcopate) Archdeacon of Berkshire.

Church of England titles
Preceded by Eric Knell	Archdeacon of Berkshire; 1968–1973	Succeeded by Raymond Birt
Preceded by Eric Knell	Bishop of Reading; 1972–1982	Succeeded by Graham Foley
