= Reading Minster =

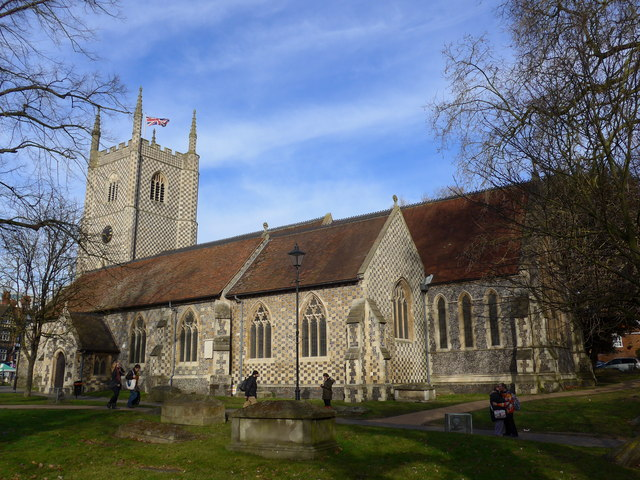
- The church tower, chequered with flint and stone

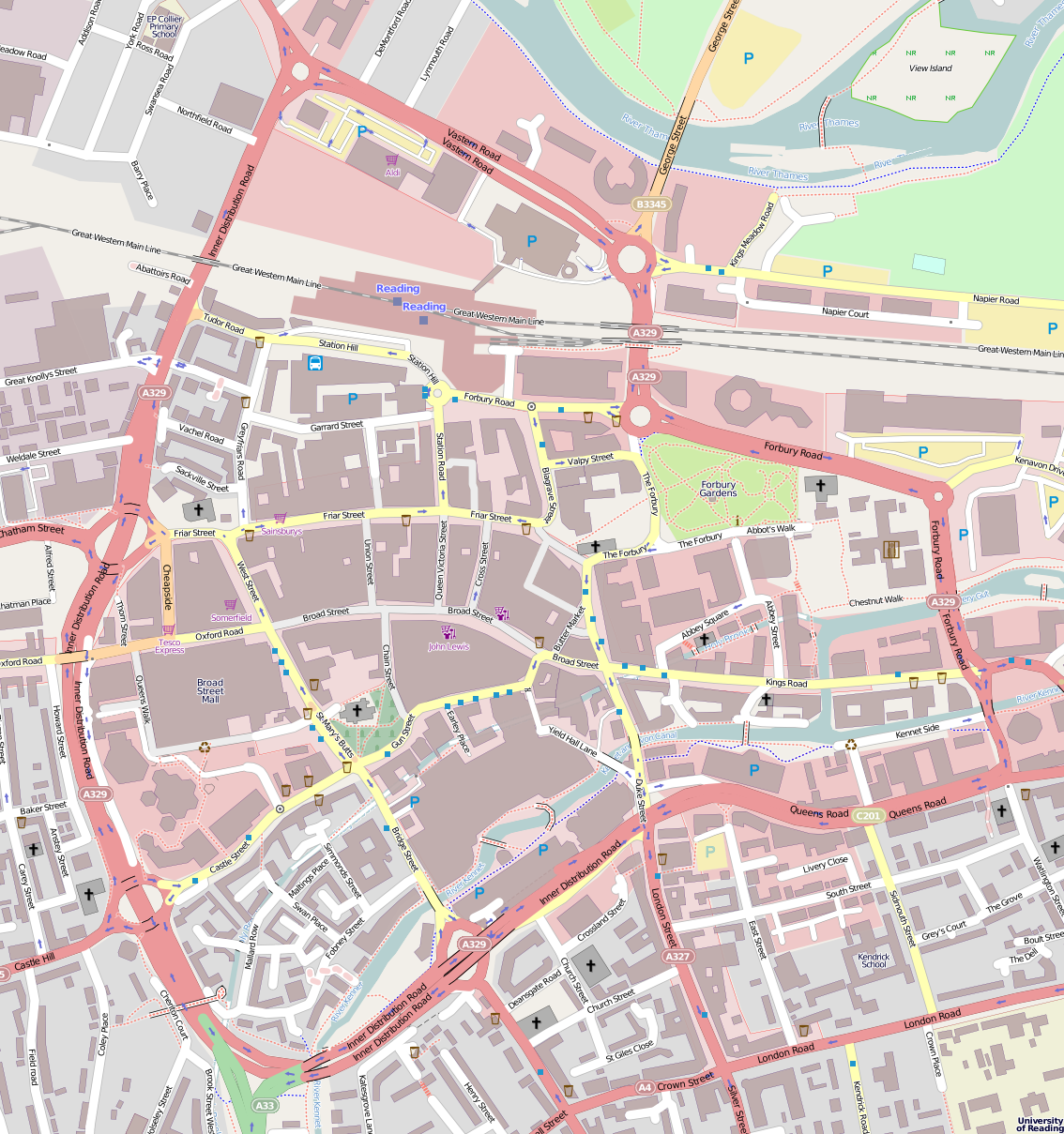
- Location within Reading Town Centre
- 51°27′16.2″N 0°58′25.0″W
- Location: Reading
- Country: England
- Denomination: Church of England
- Previous denomination: Roman Catholic
- Website: readingminster.org.uk

History
- Founded: 7th century
- Dedication: St Mary

Architecture
- Functional status: Active
- Heritage designation: Grade I
- Style: Gothic

Administration
- Diocese: Oxford
- Archdeaconry: Berkshire

Reading Minster, or the Minster Church of St Mary the Virgin, is the oldest ecclesiastical foundation in the town of Reading, Berkshire, England. Although eclipsed in importance by the later Reading Abbey, Reading Minster regained its status after the destruction of the Abbey and is now an Anglican parish church.

The minster gives its name to the street of St Mary's Butts, on which it stands. The Minster Church of St Mary the Virgin should not be mistaken for the similarly named St Mary's Church, Castle Street, which is only a few yards away.

== History ==
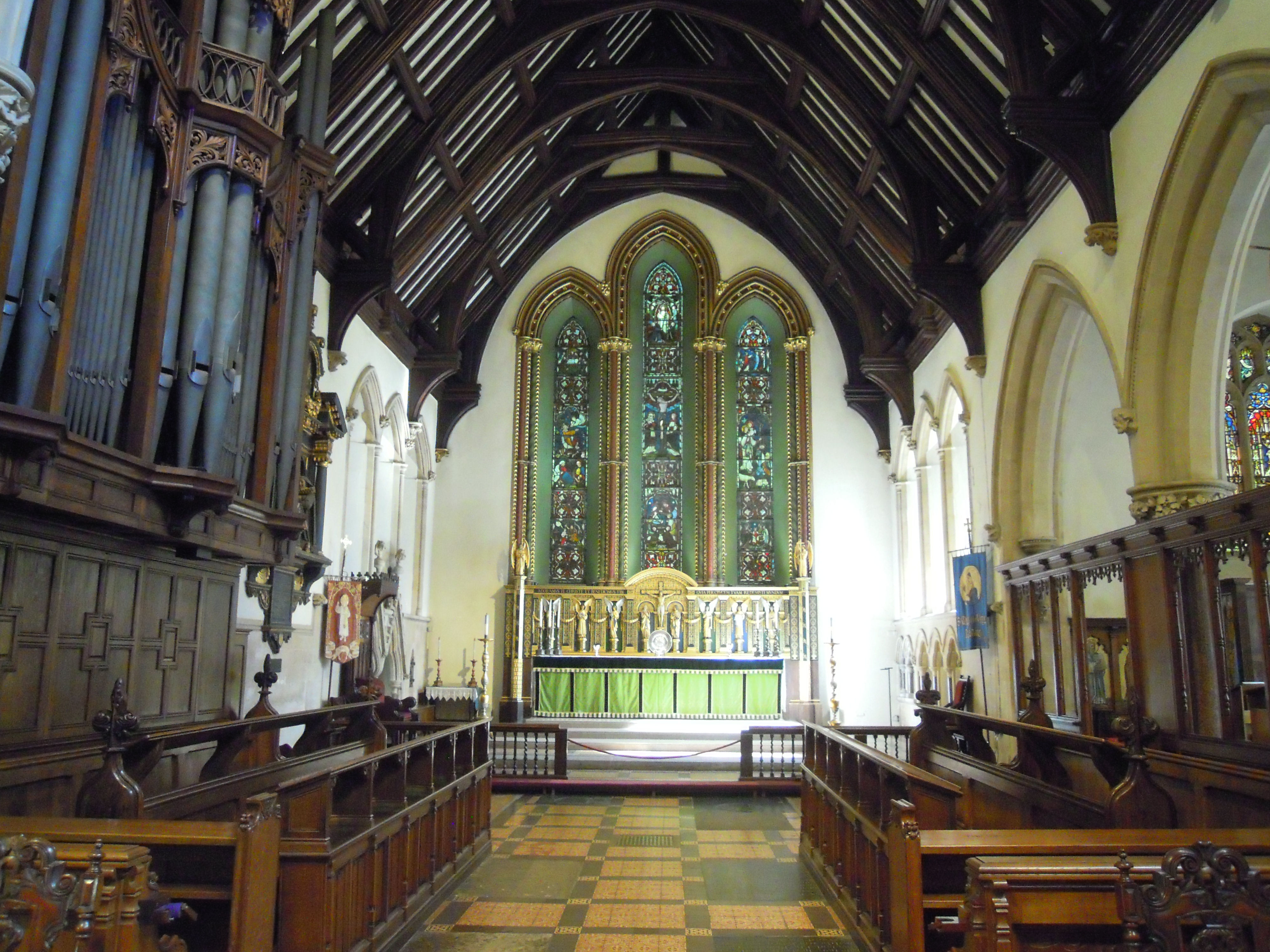
The Chancel looking East towards the Sanctuary

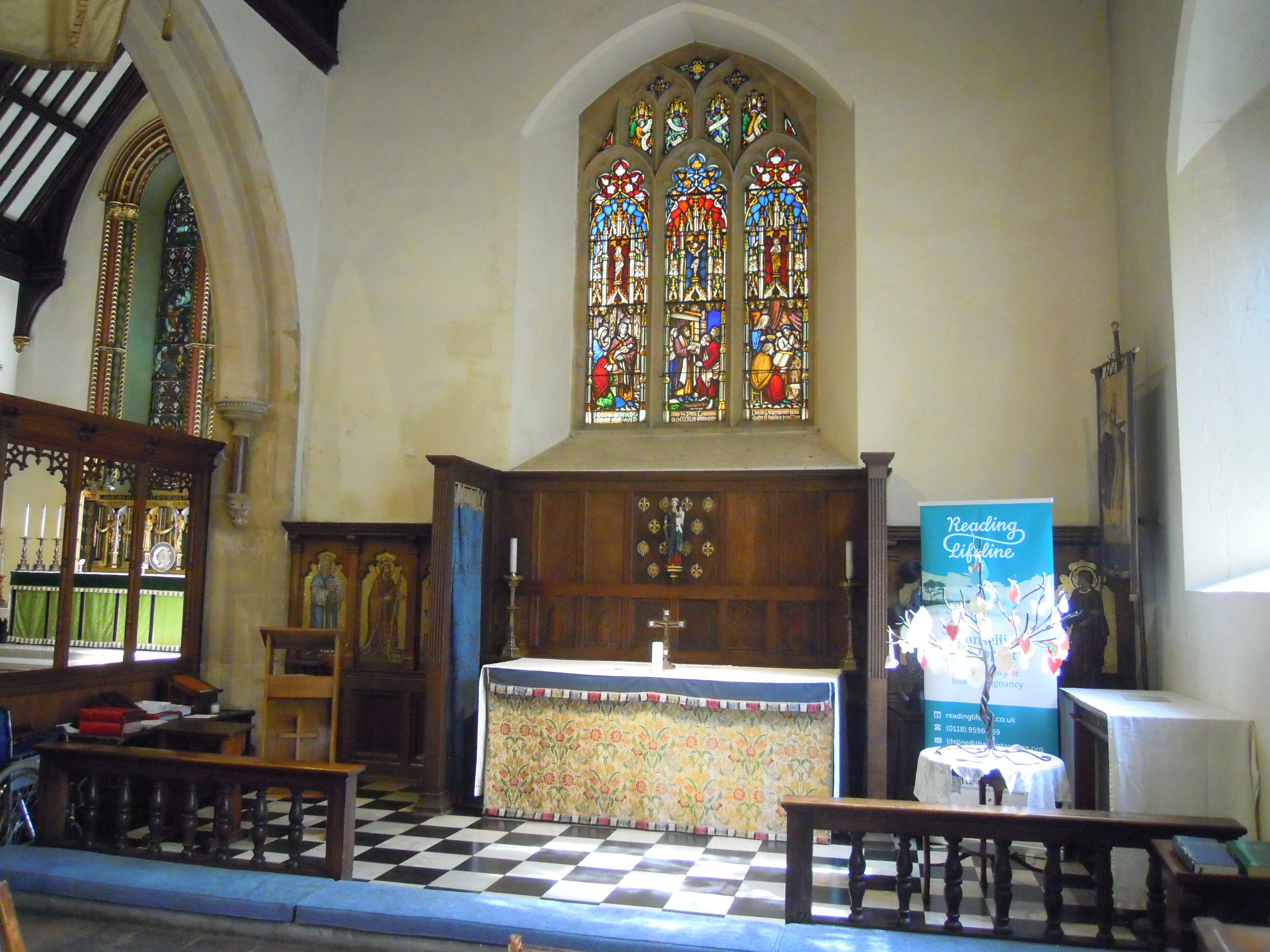
The Lady Chapel

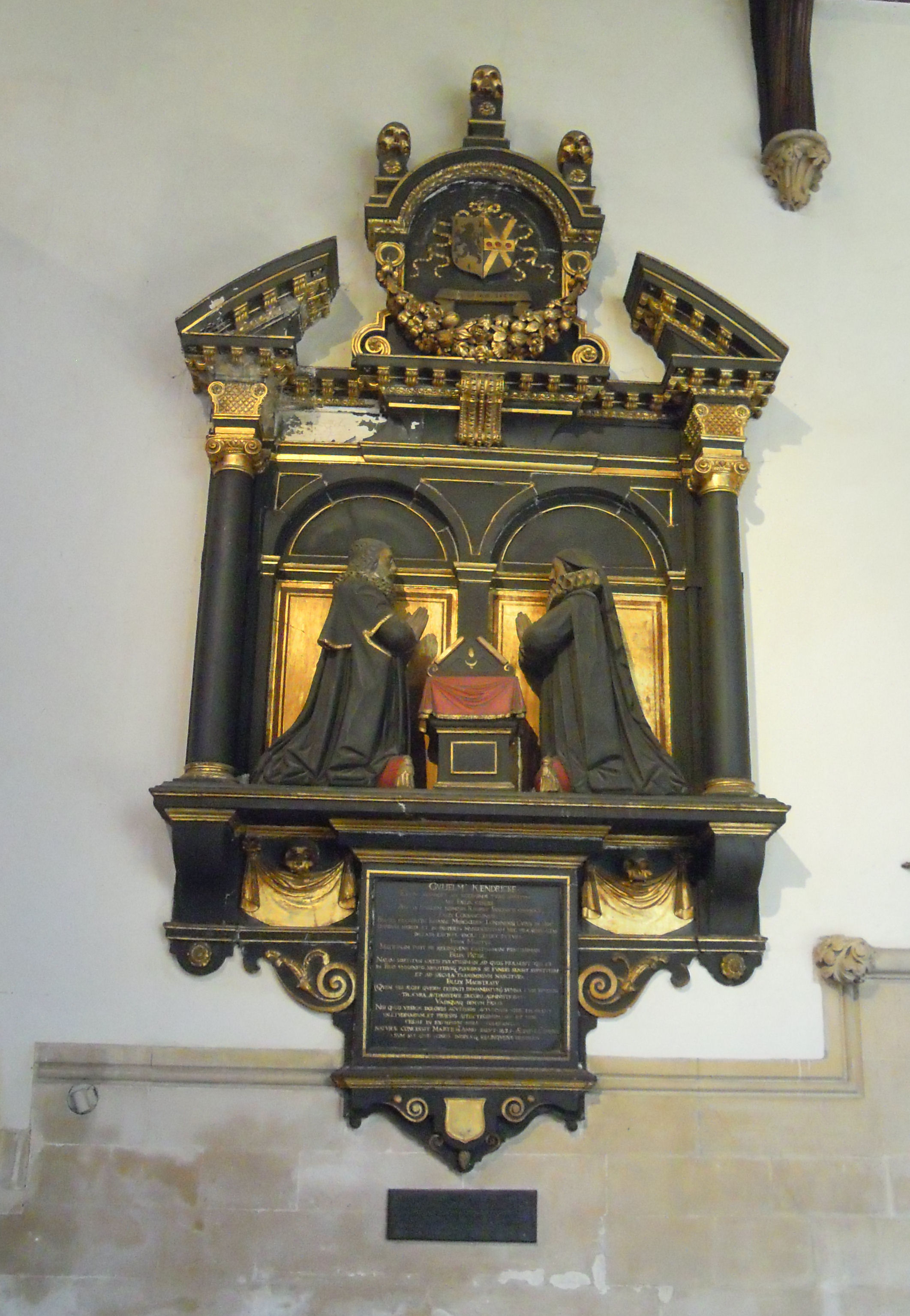
The Kendricke Monument dates to 1653

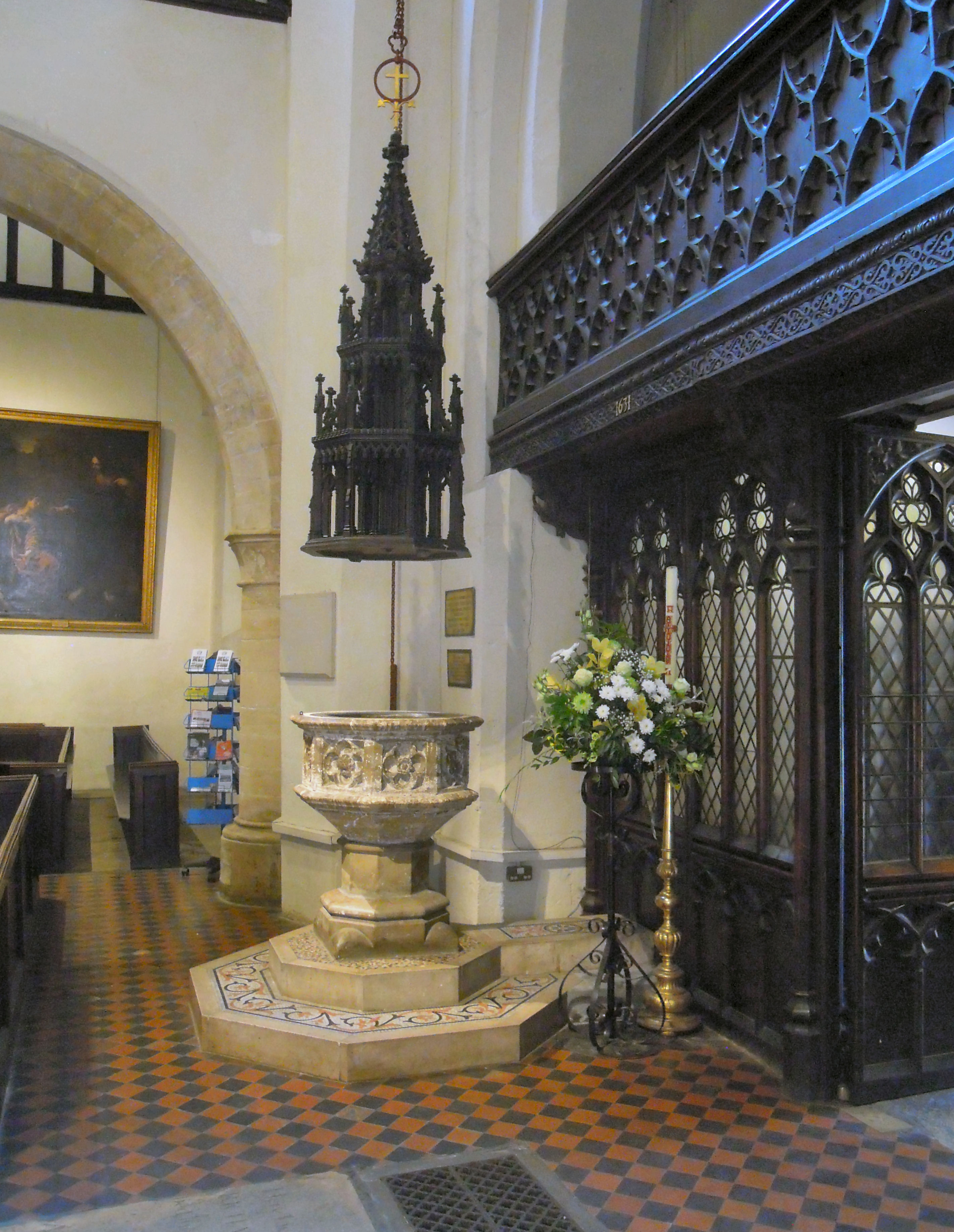
The baptismal font dates to 1616

According to unverified tradition, Saint Birinus founded a small chapel on the site of Reading Minster in the 7th century. Silver coins of the 9th century have been found in the churchyard, dating back to the period when Kings Ethelred and Alfred of Wessex were fighting the Danes at Reading, and also the era in which Reading supplanted Calleva Atrebatum (Silchester) as the local centre of importance.

In 979, Queen Ælfthryth, wife of King Edgar of England, founded a royal nunnery on the site as an act of repentance for the murder of her stepson, King Edward the Martyr. All that remains of this nunnery is a rounded Saxon door in the church, most likely used by the nuns to attend church services. In the 11th century, the Danes sacked Reading and the nunnery was destroyed. By the time of the Domesday Book, the church had been granted to Battle Abbey by William the Conqueror.

In 1121, King Henry I founded Reading Abbey which grew to become one of the most important religious and political centres of England. For the following 400 years the Abbey was the centre of ecclesiastical power in the town, and the Abbot also held the post of Rector of St Mary's. In 1371 a chantry was established by Edward III which the Mayor of Reading administered for the chapel.

The main body of the church dates from the late 11th Century, however in 1539, the Abbey was dissolved on the orders of King Henry VIII. In the Reformation that followed, St Mary's church was stripped of its altar, statues and stained glass, and by 1550 was in need of extensive repair. Between the years of 1551 and 1555 the church was extensively restored, using quantities of masonry and timber from the ruins of the Abbey. Contemporary accounts include payments for the dismantling and carriage of the Abbey's choir and nave roof, and is believed that the pillars which now separate the Minster's south aisle from the nave came from the Abbey. The baptismal font stands on the plinth of an earlier font and dates to 1616. A gift from the Vachell family, it is octagonal in shape and is carved with the arms of the Vachell, Knollys and Reades families who intermarried. Some of the carved shields represent Tudor roses and originally would have been painted in their heraldic colours. On the north wall of the chancel is an impressive black-and-gold monument to William Kendricke and his wife dated 1635. William Kendricke was churchwarden at the Minster from 1607 to 1610 and was a considerable benefactor of the church.

In 1918 a war memorial chapel, known as St Edwards Chapel, was added with entry through the old Saxon doorway of the nunnery. The church had undergone further restoration in 1863 when a new choir aisle was added, and in 1872; with further work in 1935 and 1997–2003.

== Bells ==
Most of the bells now hung in the Minster's tower date from the 17th and 18th centuries. The present peal consists of three dated 1640, two dated 1740 and two dated 1743. In 1611 the first clock was installed in the tower.

== Organ ==
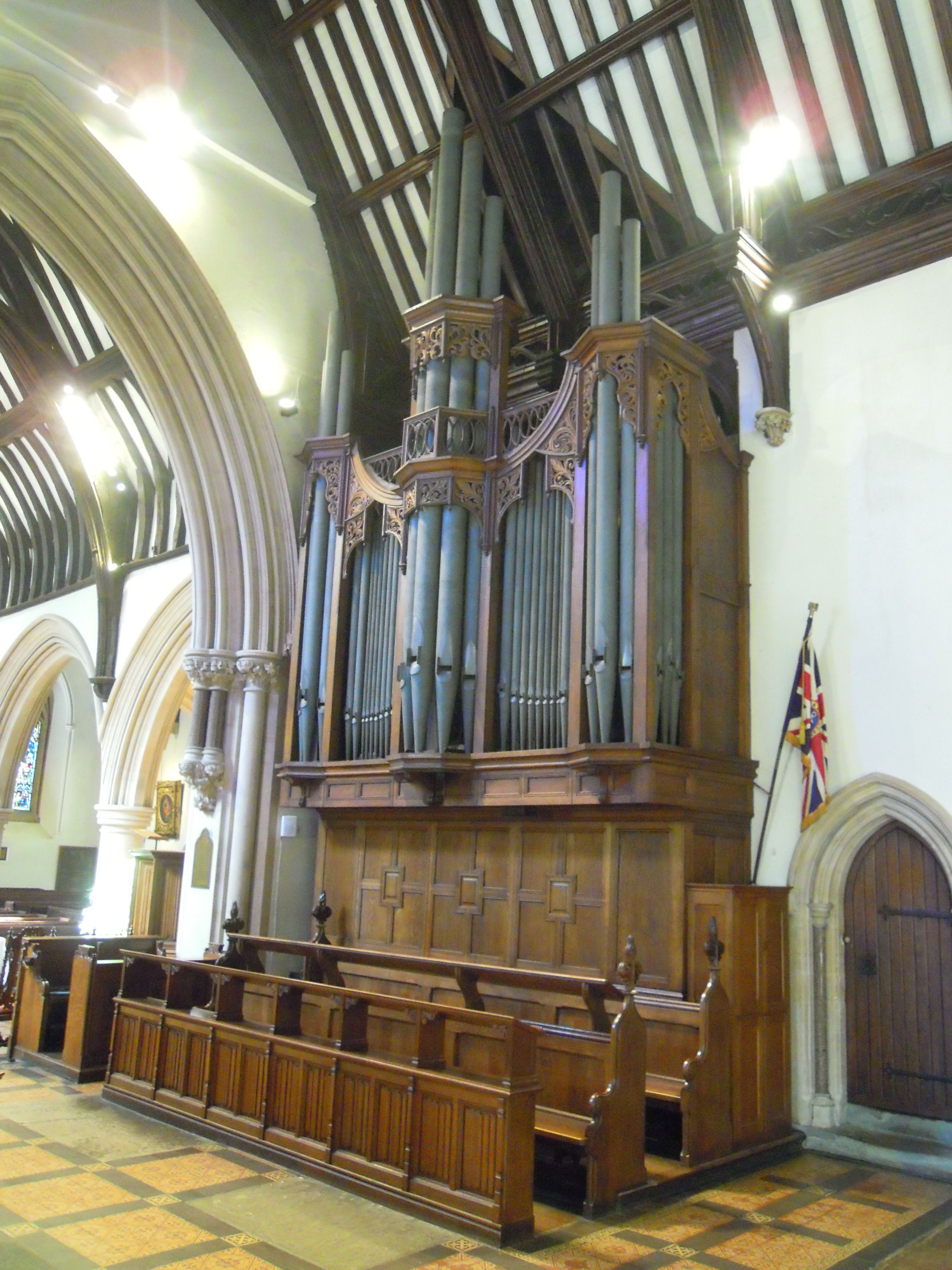
The Minster's organ dates to 1862

The Minster's organ dates was built by Father Willis for the 1862 International Exhibition. It was rebuilt by the same company in 1936. In the early 21st century, the church began a project to restore the organ. The organ was largely neglected throughout the 20th century, leaving pipes corroded, the bellows damaged and the soundboards warped. The restoration requires a fund of approximately £500,000 and aims to replace the wind system, electronics and manuals.

== Churchyard ==
The churchyard extends to the south and east of the church, and is bounded by the streets of St Mary's Butts, Gun Street, Chain Street and by an unnamed footpath connecting St Mary's Butts and Chain Street along the rear building line of the buildings fronting Broad Street. It is crossed by several other paths which carry heavy pedestrian traffic between various town centre areas. The churchyard contains a number of significant trees, including a 150-year old Indian Bean Tree (Catalpa bignonioides) that was thought, in 2007, to be unlikely to survive, but has since sprouted new growth.

Also to be found in the churchyard is the Jubilee Cross, built in 1887 to celebrate the Golden Jubilee of Queen Victoria. The monument is constructed in a 15th-century style in Portland stone, and has a tapering octagonal shaft capped by a cross. It is listed as a Grade II listed building. It has been suggested that it was constructed in reaction to the secular design of the nearby Jubilee Drinking Fountain that also celebrates the same anniversary and is located only a few feet away in the centre of St Mary's Butts.

== List of notable clergy ==
- Henry Hart Milman (1791–1868): 1818–35

== Gallery ==
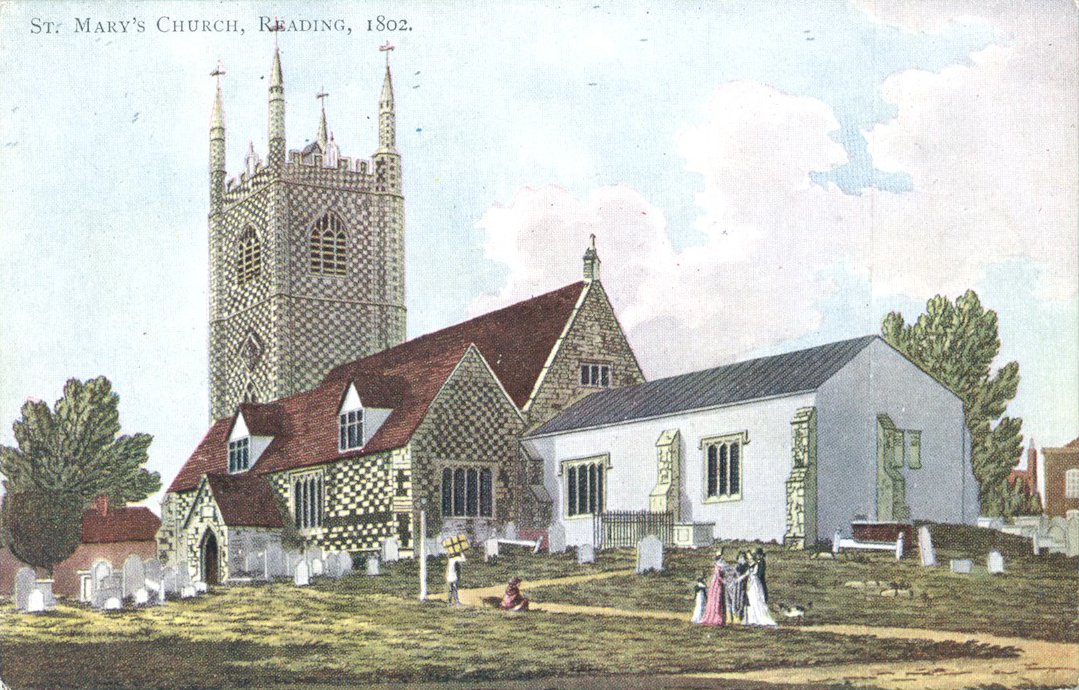
Reading Minster from the south-east, 1800-1809

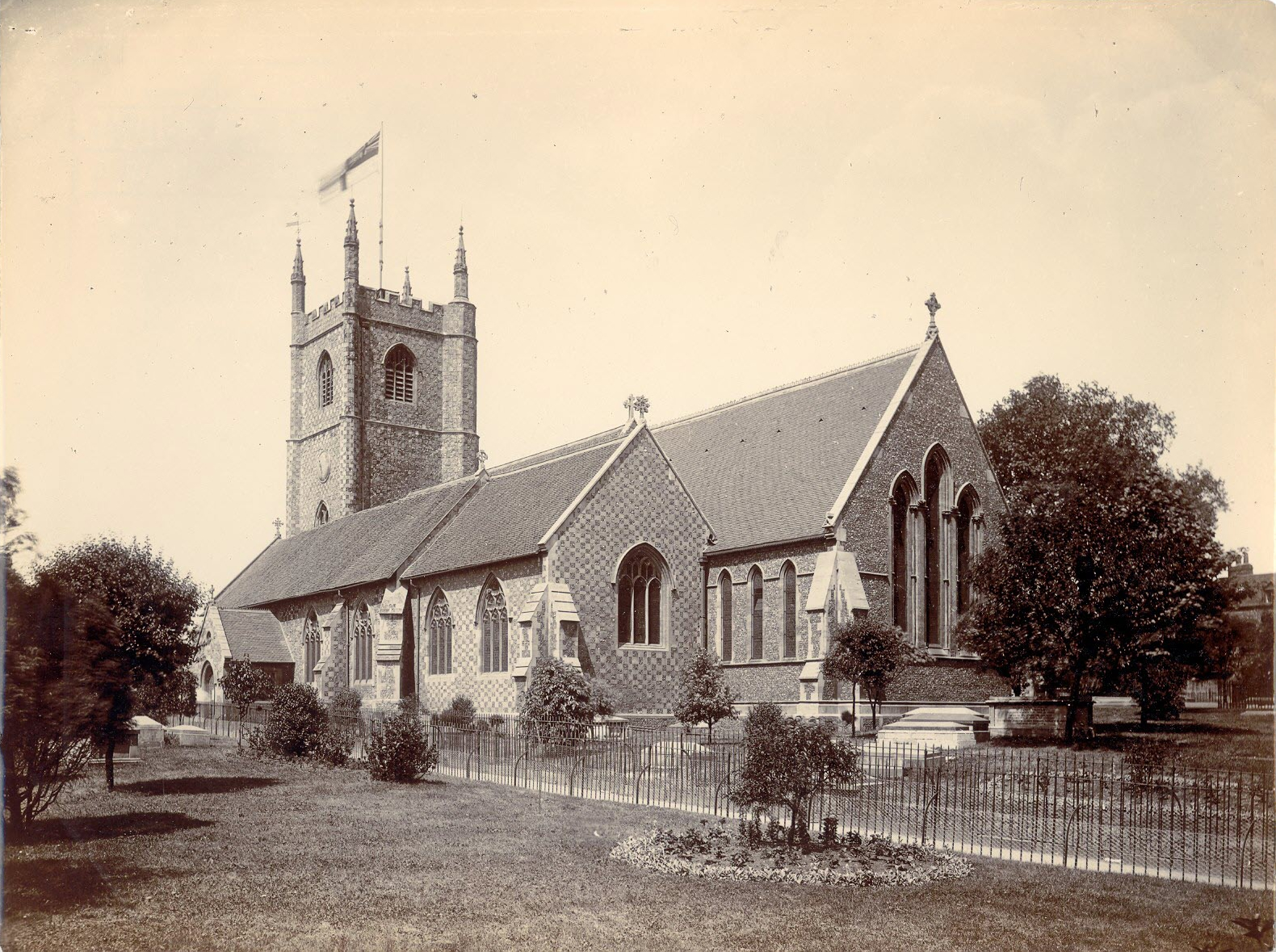
Reading Minster from the south-east, c.1887

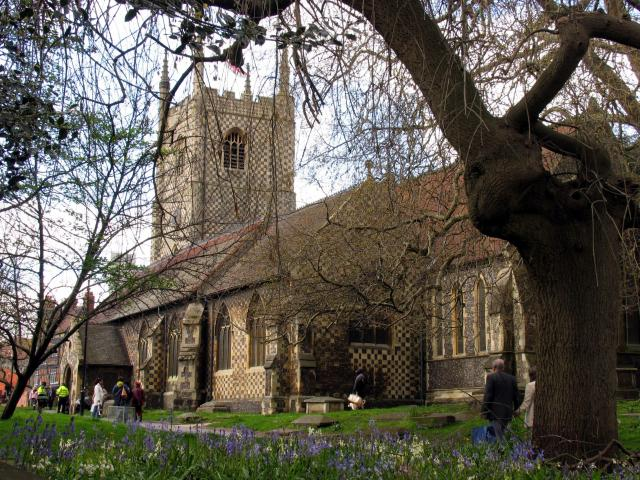
Reading Minster from the south-east, 2005

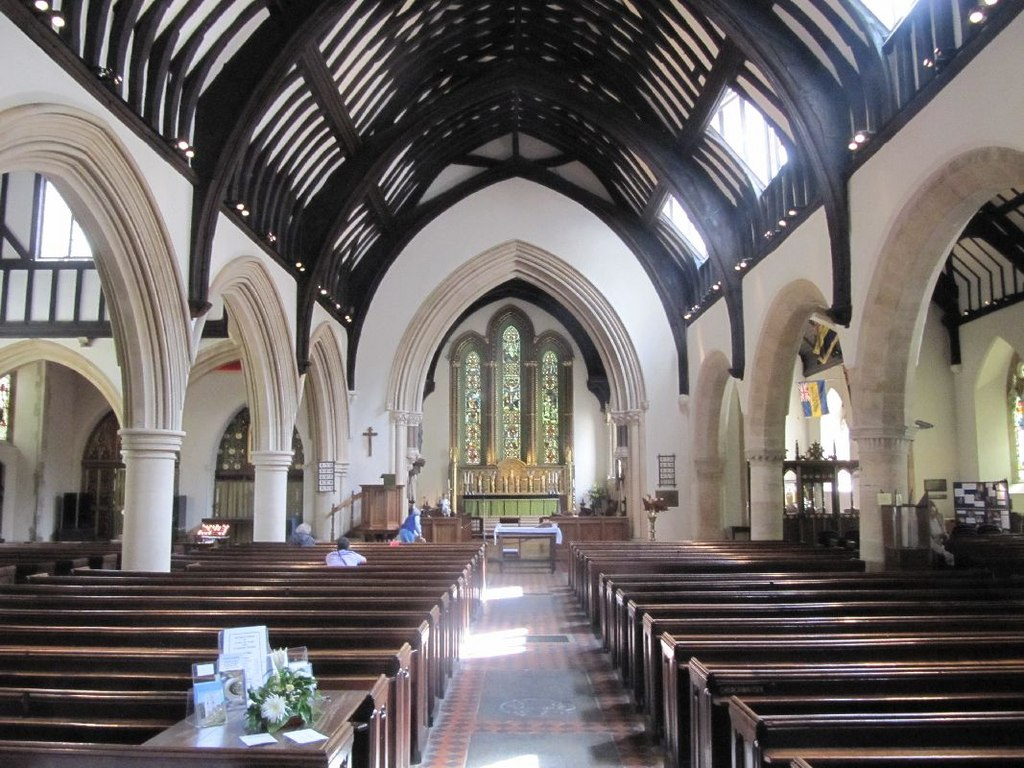
Interior of Reading Minster

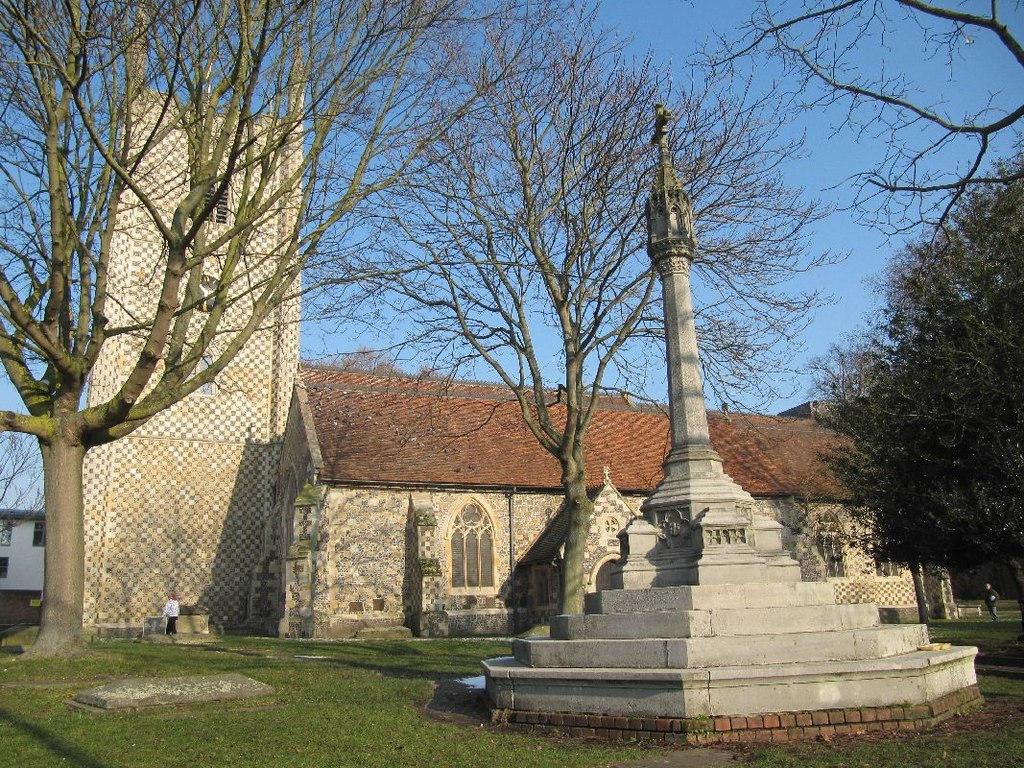
The Jubilee Cross

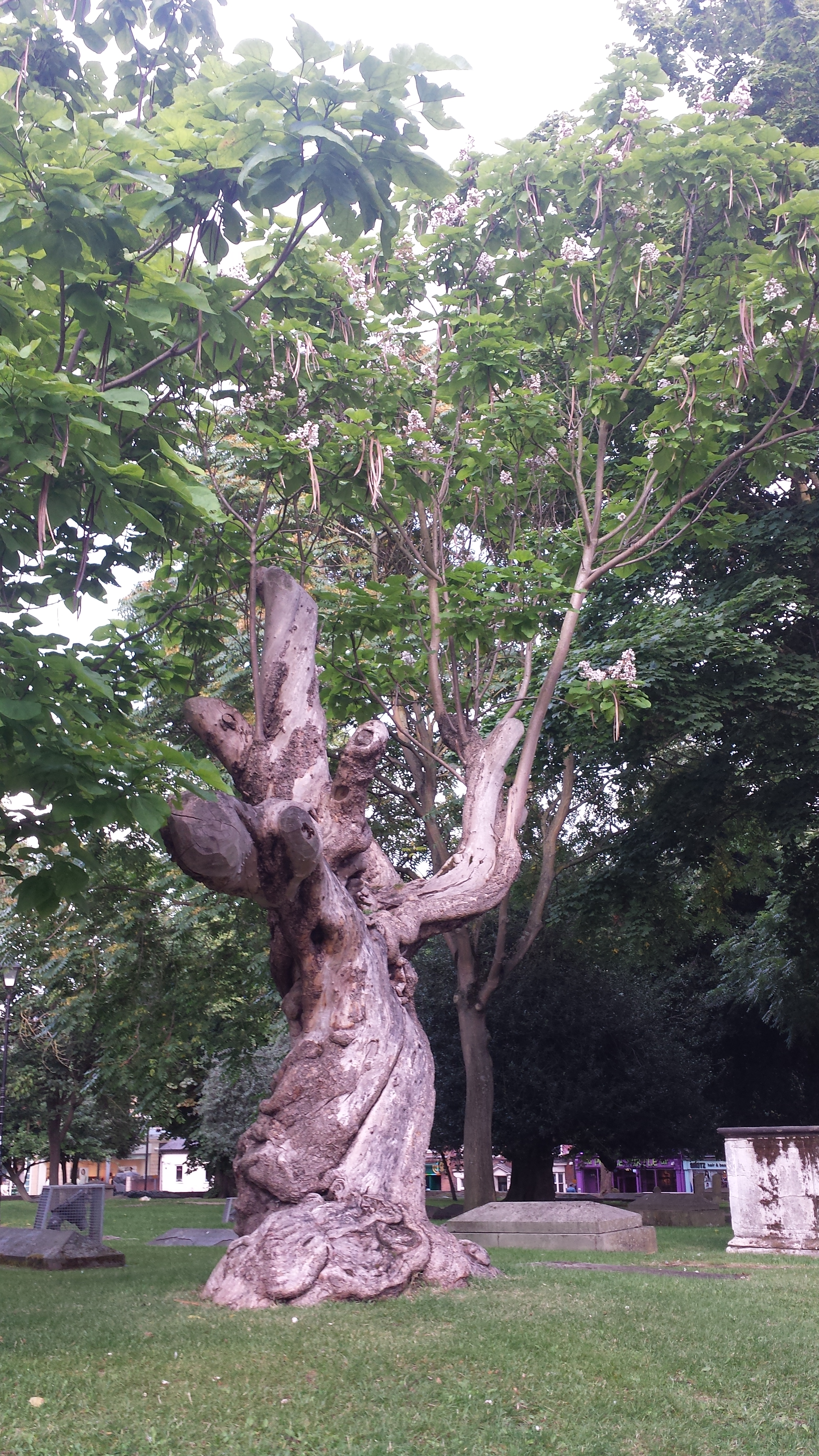
The Indian Bean Tree
