= William Richards (college administrator) =

William Richards was president of SUNY Orange, located in Orange County, New York. When he retired from SUNY Orange as its seventh president in June 2015, Dr. William Richards had completed the second-longest presidential term in the college's 65-year history, trailing only the 17-year stint of Dr. Robert Novak (1965–82). Dr. Richards died on October 16, 2016.

In total, Richards’ 36-year academic career featured 18 years in executive leadership roles on college campuses, including three years as "chief executive officer" of the Westminster campus of Front Range Community College in Denver, Colorado (2000–2003), and three years as president of Otero Junior College in La Junta Colorado (1996–99). He was also "president" of the Higher Education and Advanced Technologies (HEAT) Center, a long-range strategic planning group headquartered in Denver, during the 1999–2000 academic year.

Significant highlights from Richards’ SUNY Orange presidency include: completion of the Defining Moments capital campaign that generated $25.1 million in "private gifts" (s u s) to the college; approval, development and expansion of the Newburgh campus, which had previously been an extension center; and construction and expansion of facilities on the Middletown campus, including the campus’ crown jewel, the Rowley Center.

== Education ==
He received his B.A. in English/Physics/Mathematics (Magna Cum Laude) from Regis College (1966). He then received his M.A. in English/Writing (with Honors) from St. Louis University (1968). He then received his Ph.D. in Medieval Literature (cognate: Higher Education Policy) - University of Denver (1987).

== Career ==
- September 1979-June 1982: Coordinator, Learning Development Center, (Denver, Colorado)
- July 1982-August 1989: Dean, Developmental Studies, Community College of Denver (Denver, Colorado)
- September 1989-September 1992: Dean, Arts and Humanities, Community College of Denver (Denver, Colorado)
- August 1992-July 1996: Vice President, Educational Programs and Resources, North Harris College (Houston, Texas)
- July 1996-August 1999: President, Otero Junior College (La Junta Colorado)
- August 1999-July 2000: President, Higher Education and Advanced Technologies (HEAT) Center (Denver, Colorado) A long-range strategic planning group.
- August 2003-May 2015: President, SUNY Orange, located in Orange County, New York.
