= Leeds Clergy School =

Coordinates: 53.8045°N 1.5615°W

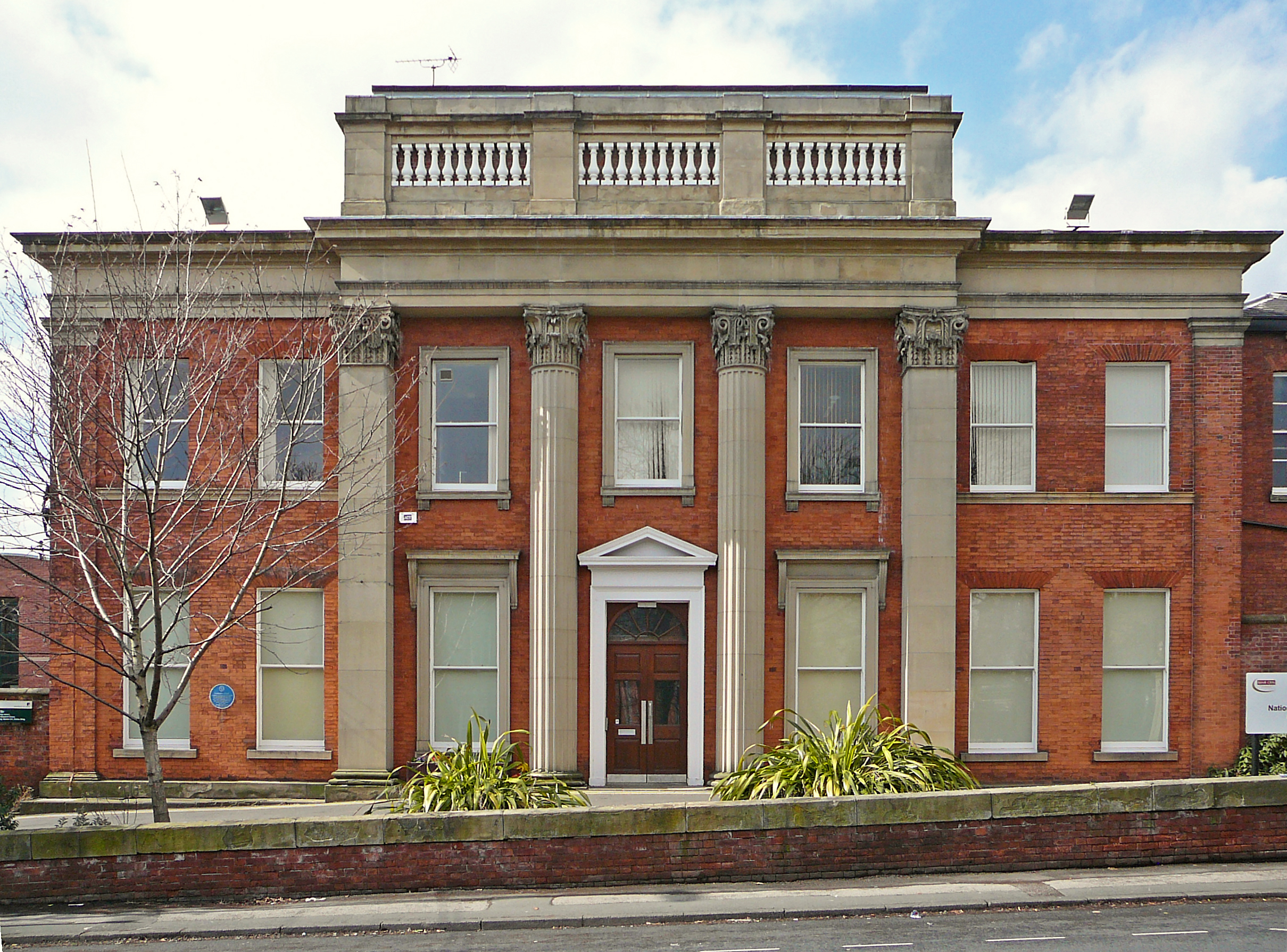
Former building of Leeds Clergy School, now known as Fairbairn House

Leeds Clergy School was a theological college of the Church of England which was founded in 1876 and closed in 1925. It was established by the Rev. John Gott, Vicar of Leeds and later Bishop of Truro, with the first principal being E C S Gibson, Lecturer at Leeds Parish Church. The school started with just six students, initially catering for those graduates who were aiming to obtain town curacies. It soon grew rapidly up to a maximum of twenty-four.

The students lived initially at Clarendon House, although they moved later to Woodsley House on Clarendon Road, overlooking the city, where the new Fowler Memorial Chapel was added and dedicated on 28 June 1896. This chapel commemorated a former principal. The governors very reluctantly decided to close the school in 1925, after its existing principal accepted a new academic appointment at Reading.

The former buildings, now known as Fairbairn House, eventually passed to the University of Leeds and after previous use as hall of residence have since become a conference centre. They have also been used as a YMCA hostel.

A few of the college archives are now held by the Thoresby Society in Leeds.

== Principals ==
- 1876–1880: Edgar Charles Sumner Gibson (formerly Vice-Principal of Wells Theological College)
- 1880–1883: William Methven Gordon Ducat
- 1883–1887: Arthur John Worlledge
- 1887-1891: George Herbert Fowler (died 1891)
- c. 1890–91: Cosmo Gordon Lang (acting principal)
- 1891–1900: Winfrid Oldfield Burrows
- 1900–1910: James Gilliland Simpson
- 1910–1919: Richard Henry Malden
- 1920–1925: John Kenneth Mozley

== Other former staff and students ==
- Roland Allen, missionary
- Maurice Harland, Bishop of Durham
- William Foxley Norris, Dean of York and Dean of Westminster
- Maurice Edwards, Chaplain-in-Chief of the Royal Air Force
