= John Brown (bishop) =

John Edward Brown (13 July 1931 – 23 October 2011) was the Bishop of Cyprus and the Gulf from 1986 to 1996.

Brown was educated at Wintringham Grammar School in Grimsby, Lincolnshire and Kelham Theological College. In 1956 he was ordained and became a curate at St. George's Cathedral, Jerusalem and master at the attached school.

Returning to England, he became a curate in Reading, Berkshire before spending 4 years on missionary work in Sudan. Back in England, he was Vicar of Stewkley, Buckinghamshire then Rural Dean of Sonning, Berkshire. From 1978 until 1986, he was Archdeacon of Berkshire before elevation to the Episcopacy. He served the Church in the Mediterranean for 8 years before retirement to his hometown of Grimsby.

Church of England titles
Preceded by Raymond Birt	Archdeacon of Berkshire; 1978–1986	Succeeded by David Griffiths
Preceded by Henry Moore	Bishop in Cyprus and the Gulf; 1986–1996	Succeeded by Clive Handford
