= Gilbert West =

English poet, translator, and theologian

Gilbert West (1703–1756) was a minor English poet, translator, and theologian in the early and middle eighteenth century. Samuel Johnson included him in his Lives of the Most Eminent English Poets.

== Biography ==
The son of Richard West, he was educated at Winchester, Eton and Christ Church, Oxford; his father intended a career in the Church for him. However, he was persuaded by his uncle, Lord Cobham to take a commission in the army but soon left to work under Lord Townshend, a prominent Whig. West left this position when it became clear that he had no prospect of advancement in such a career.

West married Miss Catherine Bartlett with whom he lived in West Wickham (near Bromley) in Kent and was appointed Treasurer of Chelsea Hospital, which provided him a modest income. During this period, following dialogue with his cousin George Lyttelton, 1st Baron Lyttelton he published the essay Observations on the history and evidence of the resurrection of Jesus Christ (1747) for which Oxford University awarded him an LLD. In 1749 West published his translations of the odes of Pindar; his translation of Pindar remained the standard version throughout the following century. Only late in his life did West achieve a measure of financial success when he was appointed to a clerkship of the Privy Council in 1752. He died four years later.

== Works ==
- Stowe, the gardens of the Right Honourable Richard, Lord Viscount Cobham (1732)
- A canto of the Fairy Queen. Written by Spenser (1739)
- The institution of the order of the garter. A dramatick poem (1742)
- Observations on the history and evidence of the resurrection of Jesus Christ (1747)
- The odes of Pindar, with several other pieces translated (1749)
- Education: a poem in two cantos (1751)
- "The oration of Plato" (translation of the funeral oration in Plato's Menexenus). In Two orations in Praise of Athenians Slain in Battle (1759).

Note: Some publication dates are posthumous.
