= Percy Lodge =

House in East Sheen

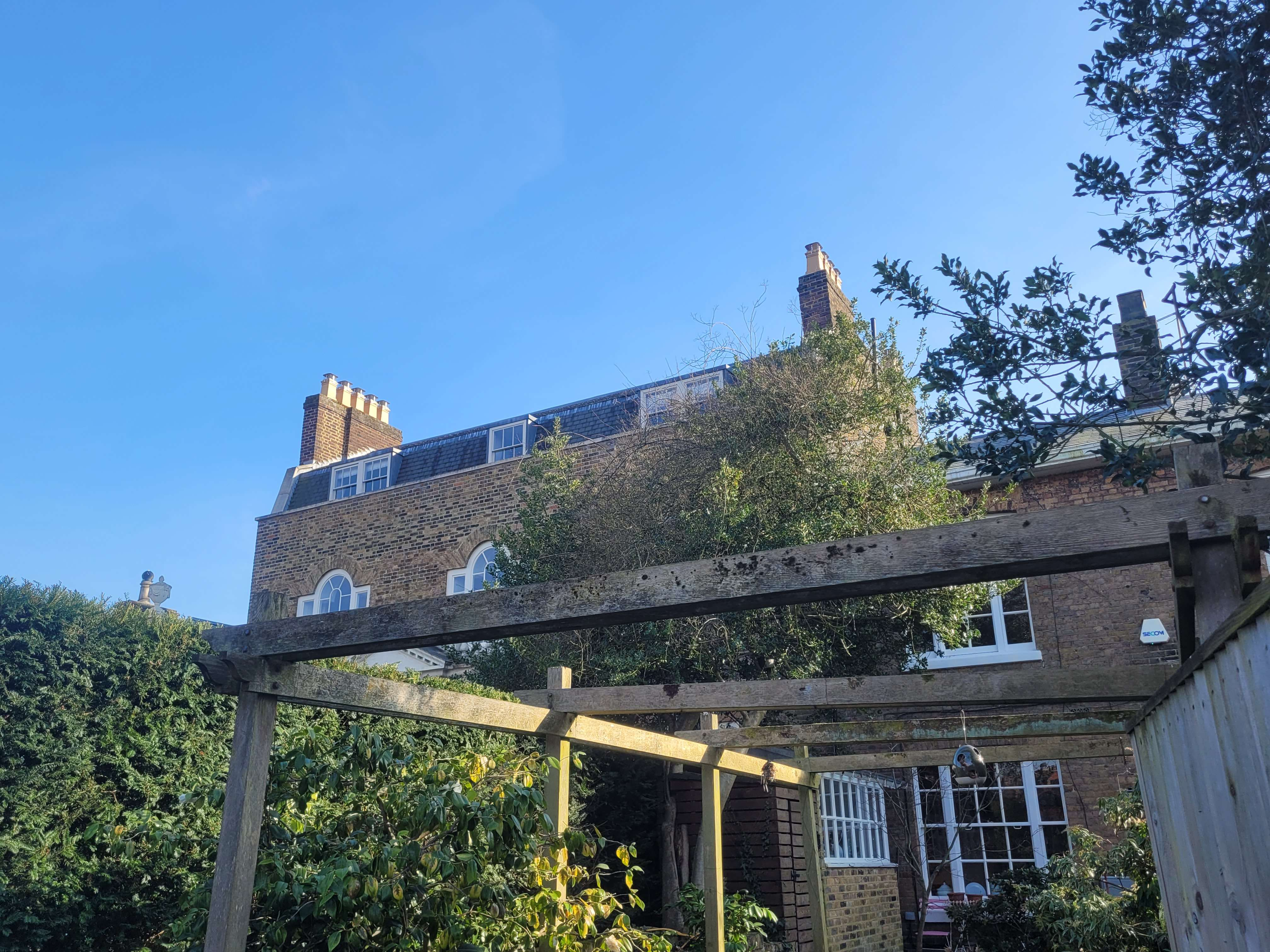

General information
- Location: East Sheen, London, England
- Coordinates: 51.4603°N 0.2708°W
- Completed: c. 1740

Listed Building – Grade II
- Official name: Percy Lodge
- Designated: 25 October 1951
- Reference no.: 1358081

Percy Lodge is a Grade II listed house in the London Borough of Richmond upon Thames, dating from around 1740, in Christchurch Road, East Sheen, near Richmond Park. It was originally used as a hunting lodge and is listed along with West Lodge, a house made from its former stables.

The house is rendered in a Georgian style, built in brickwork with Venetian windows. Other than Atkinson, notable owners of the property are said to include David Jacobs, Julia Margaret Cameron, and the Marquess of Hartington.

The name of the house points to it being built for Hugh Percy, the Duke of Northumberland. It is considered the only house in East Sheen that remains from the 18th century, a notable pre-Victorian survivor. It lies opposite The Plough public house as well as some older cottages, also designated, that are said to collectively represent the historically bucolic character of East Sheen. In the 1920s, restoration was carried out by the architect Robert Atkinson who had bought the house and saved it from demolition. The house is listed along with West Lodge, a house made from its former stables.
