= William Ducat =

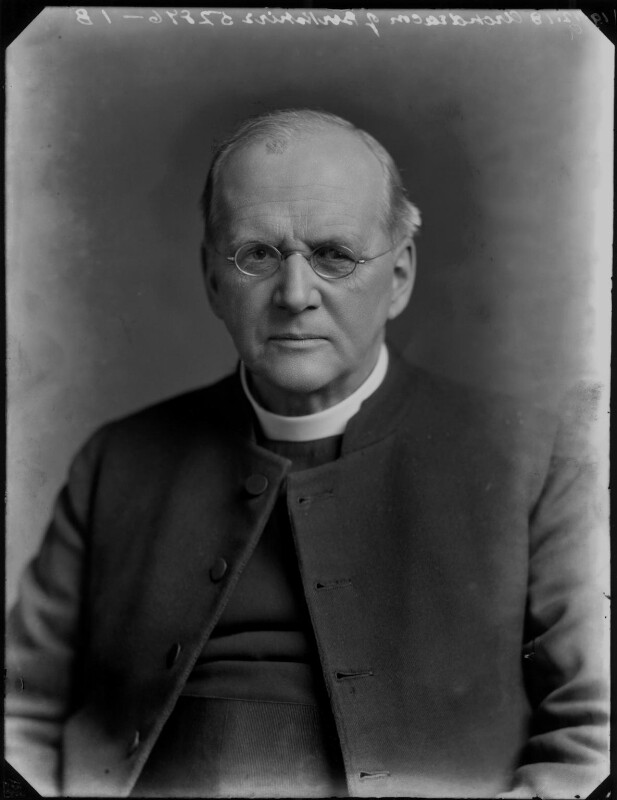
Ducat in 1918

The Ven. William Methven Gordon Ducat (17 March 1847 – 17 March 1922) was the Archdeacon of Berkshire from 1903 until his death.

Ducat was born in Edinburgh and educated at Edinburgh Academy and Balliol College, Oxford and ordained in 1873.

Ducat began his ordained ministry as a curate of All Souls, Langham Place after which he was the chaplain of Cuddesdon College. He was the rector of Lamplugh from 1877 to 1880 when he became the principal of Leeds Clergy School. He returned to Cuddesdon as Principal in 1883 and remained there until 1894 when he became the vicar of St Giles's Reading, a position he held until 1911. He was appointed archdeacon of Berkshire in early January 1903, and was a rural dean.
