= Leslie Randall (bishop) =

Bishop of Reading

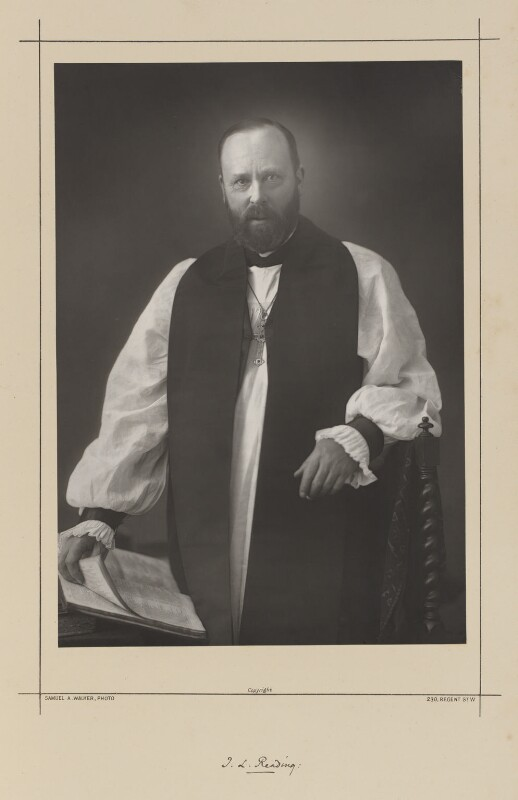
James Leslie Randall (1890)

James Leslie Randall (4 August 1828 – 17 January 1922) was an English Anglican prelate and the inaugural Bishop of Reading from 1889 until 1908.

== Biography ==
Randall was born in Dorking, Surrey, the son of James Randall, Archdeacon of Berkshire, and Rebe Lowndes. He was educated at Winchester College and New College, Oxford. He held incumbencies at Newbury, Sandhurst and Mixbury before being appointed Archdeacon of Buckingham, a post he held until elevation to the episcopate. He died on 17 January 1922 and after his death a committee was set up to fund, then place, a memorial to honour his 56 years service to the Diocese of Oxford.

In 1902, he presented a decorative font-cover, designed by G. F Bodley, to the Oxford Cathedral, in memory of his late wife.

== Death ==
Randall died in Bournemouth, aged 93.

Church of England titles
Preceded by Inaugural appointment	Bishop of Reading; 1889 – 1909	Succeeded by In abeyance
