= Archdeacon of Berkshire =

Church of England ecclesiastical office

The Archdeacon of Berkshire (also rendered Archdeacon of Berks) is a senior ecclesiastical officer in the Church of England Diocese of Oxford. The archdeacon is the head of the archdeaconry of Berkshire, a post historically found within the diocese of Salisbury, and then, from 7 October 1836, within Oxford diocese.

== List of archdeacons ==
Some archdeacons without territorial titles are recorded from around the time of the Norman Conquest; see Archdeacon of Salisbury.

=== High Medieval ===
- c. 1150–aft. 1156: Roger
- bef. 1173–bef. 1205: Geoffrey de Vernun
- bef. 1206–aft. 1215: Alberic
- aft. 1204–aft. 1222: Geoffrey
- bef. 1224–aft. 1236: William of Merton
- c. 1236: Clement
- c. 1236: William de Raley
- bef. 1237–aft. 1255: Giles of Bridport
- c. 1265: William
- bef. 1266–aft. 1268: Walter Scammel
- bef. 1275–bef. May 1284: Stephen of Newbury
- aft. June 1284–bef. 1313: William de Berges

=== Late Medieval ===
- 10 March 1313–bef. December 1313: Richard de Bello
- bef. December 1313–bef. August 1331 (d.): Tydo de Varesio
- 14 September 1317: Gilbert de Stapleton (ineffective royal grant)
- 21 August 1331–aft. 1333: Robert de Ayleston (previously Archdeacon of Wiltshire)
- bef. 1334–aft. 1359: Edmund de la Beche (collated 12 September 1339)
- aft. 1359–bef. 1365 (res.): Thomas Paxton
- 10 December 1365 – 1366 (res.): John Harewell
- bef. 1371–aft. 1384: Guillaume Cardinal d'Aigrefeuille
  (Cardinal-priest of St Stephen al Monte Celio)
- 26 October 1389–aft. 1392: Thomas Yokflete
- papal grants:
  - ?–1390: Andrea Cardinal Bontempi Martini
    (Cardinal-priest of SS Marcellinus and Peter)
  - 1390–22 April 1395 (exch.): Christopher Cardinal Marini
    (Cardinal-priest of San Ciriaco alle Terme Diocleziane)
  - 22 April 1395 – 25 November 1397 (res.): Walter Cook
- royal grants:
  - 22 September 1395: John Southam
  - 28 September 1395: Walter Cook
  - 20 October 1395: Ralph Repyngton
  - c. 16 November 1395: John Wynwyk
- 9 February 1397 – 30 January 1404 (exch.): John Southam (afterwards Archdeacon of Oxford)
- 30 January–15 March 1404 (d.): Thomas Southam
- bef. 10 June 1404–?: John Fraunceys
- aft. 10 June–26 December 1404 (exch.): Simon Sydenham
- 26 December 1404–c. 21 July 1417 (exch.): Walter Medford
- c. 21 July 1417–bef. 31 May 1427: Peter de Alcobasso
- 25 June 1427 – 1431 (res.): Thomas Brunce
- 15 September 1431–bef. 1432: John Castell (possibly the Master of Univ)
- 24 September 1432 – 1433 (d.): Alexander Sparrow
- 18 October 1433 – 1462 (d.): John Norton (probably the Chancellor of Oxford)
- 15 February 1462 – 1464 (d.): Richard Ewen
- 9 March 1464 – 1465 (res.): Robert Stillington
- 28 February 1466 – 1476 (res.): John Russell
- 6 November 1476 – 1478 (res.): John Morton
- 31 December 1478 – 1482 (res.): Richard Martyn (also Archdeacon of London and Archdeacon of Hereford; became Bishop of St David's)
- bef. 1 December 1488 – 1492 (res.): Oliver King
- 15 January 1493 – 1507 (res.): Stephen Bereworth
- 5 February 1507 – 1509 (d.): Christopher Twineho
- 20 December 1509 – 24 December 1510 (res.): Stephen Bereworth (again)
- 24 December 1510 – 1522 (d.): William Grey
- 14 February 1522 – 1545 (d.): Robert Audley

=== Early modern ===
- 18 July 1545 – 1547 (d.): John Crayford (also Master of University College, Oxford, 1546-7)
- 24 September 1547 – 3 September 1557 (d.): William Pye (afterwards Dean of Chichester)
- 24 September 1557 – 12 June 1588 (d.): Thomas Whyte
- 16 June 1588 – 1605 (d.): Martin Culpepper, Dean of Chichester
- 9 November 1605–bef. 1631 (d.): Leonel Sharp (imprisoned for sedition)
- 26 January 1631 – 1634 (res.): Edward Davenant
- 20 November 1634 – 19 August 1665 (d.): John Ryves
- 29 August 1665 – 1673 (res.): Peter Mews
- 26 April 1673 – 1689 (res.): John Sharp (also Dean of Norwich from 1681)
- 6 December 1689 – 1698 (res.): William Richards
- 12 May 1698–bef. 1710 (d.): Jonas Proast
- 25 April 1710 – 2 December 1716 (d.): Richard West
- 13 May 1717 – 9 December 1720 (d.): Edward Talbot
- 10 January 1721 – 1735 (res.): Martin Benson
- 8 March 1735 – 9 December 1746 (d.): Samuel Knight
- 2 January 1747 – 21 October 1763 (d.): John Spry
- 25 October 1763 – 23 October 1785 (d.): William Dodwell
- 12 November 1785 – 15 October 1817 (d.): Arthur Onslow (also Dean of Worcester from 1795)
- 5 December 1817 – 25 August 1832 (d.): John Fisher
- 7 September 1832–1836: Edward Berens

Archdeaconry transferred to Diocese of Oxford, 7 October 1836

- 1836–1855 (res.): Edward Berens
- 21 March 1855 – 3 September 1869 (res.): James Randall

=== Late modern ===
- 1870–1903 (res.): Alfred Pott
- 1903–17 March 1922 (d.): William Ducat
- 1922–1942 (res.): Richard Wickham Legg
- 1942–1954 (res.): Arthur Parham, Bishop suffragan of Reading
- 1955–1967 (res.): Eric Knell, Bishop suffragan of Reading
- 1968–1973 (res.): Eric Wild (also Bishop suffragan of Reading from 1972)
- 1973–1976 (res.): Raymond Birt
- 1978–1986 (res.): John Brown
- 1987–1992 (res.): David Griffiths
- 1992–1998 (res.): Mike Hill
- 1998–31 May 2013 (ret.): Norman Russell
- 11 October 2013 – 19 November 2019: Olivia Graham (became Bishop of Reading)
- 29 February 2020 – present: Stephen Pullin

== Sources ==
- Greenway, Diana E. (1991), Fasti Ecclesiae Anglicanae 1066–1300, vol. 4, pp. 28–31
- Horn, Joyce M. (1962), Fasti Ecclesiae Anglicanae 1300–1541, vol. 3, pp. 9–11
- Horn, Joyce M. (1986), Fasti Ecclesiae Anglicanae 1541–1857, vol. 6, pp. 14–16
- Horn, Joyce M. (1996), Fasti Ecclesiae Anglicanae 1541–1857, vol. 8, p. 86
- Account of Purley on Thames – Archdeacons (PDF) (accessed 4 December 2012)
