= King Edward VI Aston School =

Location
- Frederick Road; Birmingham, B6 6DJ; England; 52.5036536°N 1.8855758°W

Information
- Type: Grammar school; Academy
- Motto: Dieu et mon droit ("God and my right")
- Religious affiliation: Christian
- Established: 1883
- Specialist: Sports
- Department for Education URN: 137043 Tables
- Ofsted: Reports
- Headteacher: Matt Brady
- Staff: 109
- Gender: Boys
- Age: 11 to 18
- Enrolment: 963
- Houses: Brandon, Manton, Floyd, Hawley, Temperley
- Alumni: Old Edwardians
- Website: https://www.keaston.bham.sch.uk/

King Edward VI Aston School is a selective, all-boys grammar school and specialist sports college. The school, designed by Birmingham architect J. A. Chatwin,, an old boy of the related King Edward's School, opened in 1883 and is still, with additional buildings, located on its original site, in the Aston area of Birmingham, England. King Edward VI Aston Grammar School does not charge tuition fees; pupils must pass an 11-plus entrance exam to get into the school. The King Edward Schools are fiercely competitive to get admission to. The King Edward VI Foundation holds its exams at the same time, and generally, a candidate will sit one exam for multiple schools within the foundation.

The school is part of the Foundation of the Schools of King Edward VI, which runs nine schools in Birmingham. Currently, Aston has 963 boys.

The current headteacher is Matt Brady.

== History ==
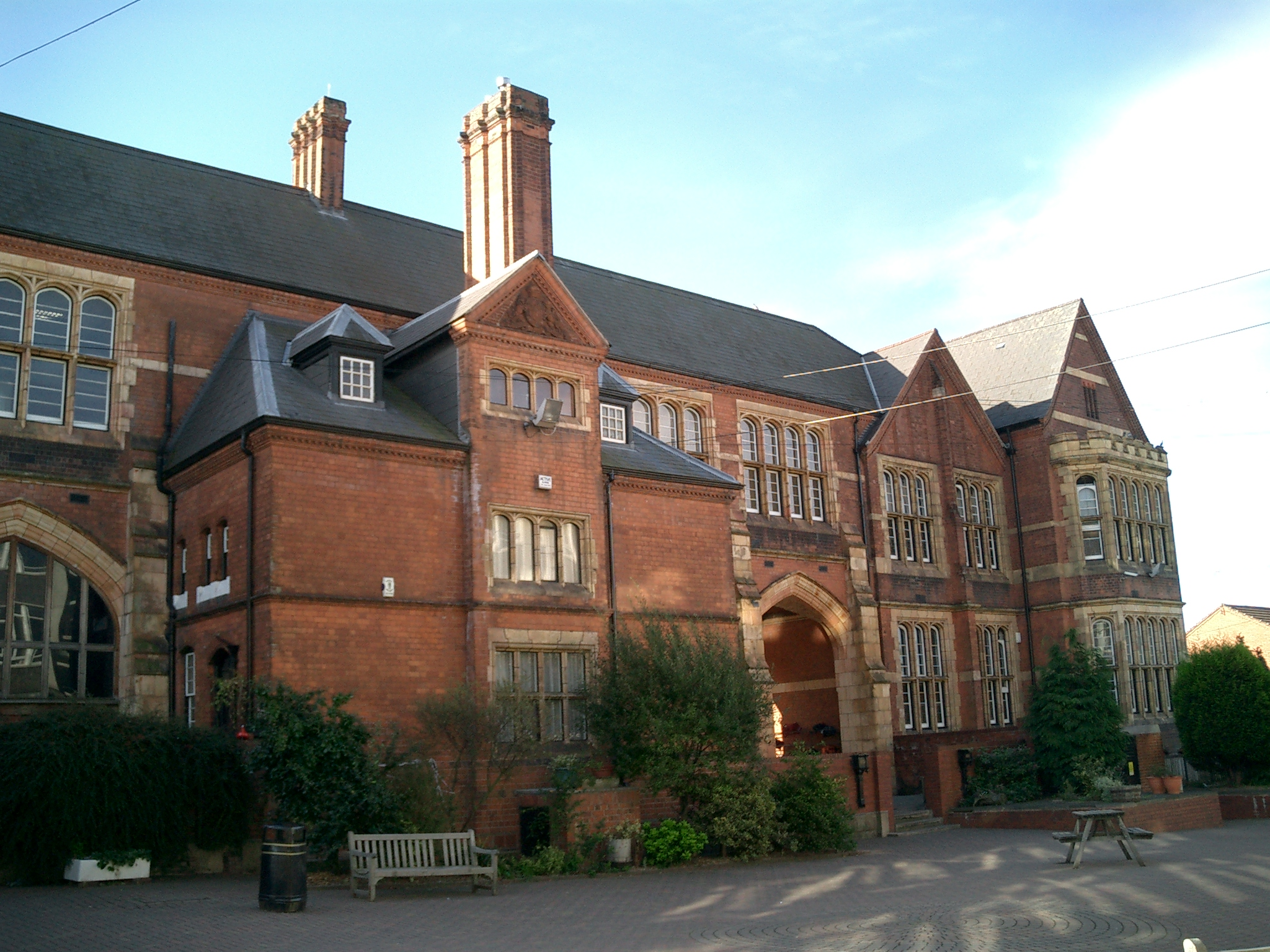
Rear of the 'Old Building' at King Edward VI Aston.

The King Edward VI Aston Grammar School was opened in 1883. In 1911, the girls' school moved out to a new building in Handsworth and merged with two smaller Foundation schools (Summer Hill and Bath Row). The whole Aston building was then used for boys. With the departure of the girls, the Pyramus and Thisbe Wall (which had previously served to separate the boys from the girls) was also removed. King Edward VI Aston is the only school in the foundation that still occupies its original site. The original buildings are still in regular use, but there have been significant alterations and extensions. In 1963, the "New Building" was opened. More recently, the school has added a sports hall and a building to house the languages departments and has acquired the part of Frederick Road that formerly bisected the site.

The 1963 building, now known as Douglas House (after a double-fronted Victorian villa that stood on the same site), has been extended and refurbished to provide four extra laboratories, a teaching kitchen, new classrooms for art, design technology and music, a conference room, a first aid room and offices. The extension was named the Watcyn Thomas Wing, after a former Welsh Rugby International who taught at the school for 37 years. It was opened on 20 May 2008 by Bob Simpson, an Aston Old Edwardian (as former pupils are known) and governor of the school.

The school is currently building a new catering facility near the sports hall, and has already constructed a new car park at the top of Albert Road.

The school also has a school song written in the late 1800s to commemorate the stature and honour of Edward VI.

=== Headmasters ===
Aston has had ten headmasters:

- John Temperley – 1883—1894 (11 years)
- Ernest W. Floyd – 1894—1912 (18 years)
- Joseph Manton – 1913—1936 (23 years)
- Leonard G. Brandon – 1937—1970 (33 years)
- Dennis W. Hawley – 1970—1984 (14 years)
- Neil W. Gamble – 1985—1991 (6 years)
- Peter A. Christopher – 1992—2004 (12 years)
- Colin Parker – 2004—2020 (16 years)
- Amy Whittall – 2020—2021 (interim)
- Matt Brady – 2021—present

The average term for an Aston headmaster has been approximately sixteen years. The longest-serving was L. G. Brandon, who held the position for 33 years (one hundred terms).

== House system ==
The House System within the school has a fundamental role in the school's structure. It was introduced circa 1908 and very quickly produced a marked improvement in sporting standards. There were four houses which, until 1945, were known by the names of the Housemasters. The first of these were Jones's (which became Floyd house), Higgs's (which became Temperley), Lane's and Fisher's. The last two became Manton and School, though which was which is not clear from the records. This could be quite confusing when the housemaster changed, so in 1945 the present system was introduced.

From late 2009 until 2017, there were once more four houses, each of which took its name from a previous Headmaster at the school (i.e. Manton, house colour yellow, emblem a portcullis; Temperley, purple, Tudor rose; Floyd, blue (formerly brown), lion rampant; and Brandon, green, fleur de lis). Until it was ended in 1968, the fourth house was named School. From 2017, there is another house, Hawley, named after the headmaster from 1970–1984, Dennis W. Hawley. Its colour is silver and emblem is a shield.

The houses compete against each other throughout the year, in both sporting and non-sporting events. The culmination of the year's sporting House achievements is represented by the presentation of the Hawkesford Trophy (for sports) and Tuck Trophy (for non-sports) to the successful Head of House.

== Sports ==
Recognised as a Sports College, King Edward's Aston offers as many as 27 sports and specialises in a good number of them during afternoon games sessions for all Year 7–11 pupils.

- Rugby (Main School Sport) – Autumn/Winter/Early Spring
- Hockey – Autumn/Winter/Early Spring
- Athletics – Spring/Summer
- Cricket – Spring/Summer
- Basketball
- Football – Spring/Summer
- Badminton
- Tennis
- Table tennis

Sixth form pupils are offered the chance to take part in non-sporting activities during their games lessons. This has previously included undertaking conservation work at Moseley Bog.

Every year, each house competes to win the Hawkesford Trophy and Tuck Trophy based on each house's performance in a variety of sports, starting in October with the cross country race involving a 1-mile lap around Aston Park located next door to the school, and academic events, such as House Drama, House Economics, and House Scrabble. Throughout the three terms, there are sporting events such as football, badminton, basketball, volleyball, cricket, rugby, rugby sevens, tennis, and hockey, and it all culminates to the end-of-year sports day at nearby Alexander Stadium for Years 7–10.

=== Sporting visits ===
In July 2006, 35 rugby players and five staff completed a rugby tour of Australia. Previous tour destinations have included Northern Ireland and South Africa. In the summer of 2009 a tour of South Africa was completed. Additionally, each year, a group of students, usually those studying for GCSE PE, spends one week a year at Ogwen Cottage in Snowdonia, North Wales. Here, they take part in outward bounds activities such as kayaking, rock climbing, orienteering and hill walking.

== Music and drama ==
Music and Drama are both very active departments within the school.

=== Music ===
The Music department offers tuition in almost any instrument. All boys who play an instrument are able to join one of the many ensembles in the school, ranging from the Training Band to the Big Band, which has recorded three CDs. While the school has its own String Orchestra and Concert Band, it also has a joint Orchestra with King Edward VI Handsworth. Every ensemble performs in at least one concert a year. Several of them, particularly the school Big Band, perform in many more. The department draws senior musicians from all ensembles to form pit bands for the school productions.

Each year the department is host to the annual House Music Festival in which all boys in years seven to ten have the opportunity to show off their musical talents and represent their house. The competitors are divided into several categories, by year group and instrument. Each competitor can perform in as many solo categories as they are able, and in one ensemble. The performances are judged by a visiting adjudicator.

Each year the department goes on tour and in July 1974 a number of musicians departed for Rhodesia. They met with and performed for Ian Smith and toured the country before coming under attack by the Zanu-PF on the train from Bulawayo to Pretoria.

In July 2008, many members of the same bands departed on a tour to the Rhineland.

=== Drama ===
The Drama department has a range of extracurricular activities going on throughout the year. Annually, alongside the girls' school, King Edward VI Handsworth, Aston puts on at least one full school production. The location of the main school play alternates each year, with both schools hosting a number of smaller productions. In recent years, Aston has staged West Side Story, The Threepenny Opera, October's Children, The Visit and Guys and Dolls. Productions of Return to the Forbidden Planet, Little Shop of Horrors, Grease and Fame have been staged at the girls' school with boys from Aston taking part.

The combined Sixth Forms of Aston and Handsworth also stage a production of one of Shakespeare's plays once a year.

The Drama Department also holds a House competition, in the form of the House Drama Festival. In recent years, the format has changed but the objectives are still the same. Each house holds a short production and competes against each other. A panel of judges decides which production was the best.

== Festival of Cultures ==
For many, the highlight of the school year is the annual Festival of Cultures held in July, after all examinations have finished. The Festival aims to celebrate the broad diversity of cultures represented in the school community. It also provides students with opportunities to take part in a wide range of activities associated with individual cultures in workshops.

Before 2005, the Festival of Cultures took place during afternoon school, and students attended one workshop. The Festival also continued into the evening, with students and their families, staff, old boys, and new students (set to join in September) invited. The evening consists of a programme of entertainment, based largely on the workshops from the day. There are also displays of art work and several food outlets, including a tea shop, a barbecue and the International Food Hall. There are also several stalls, including, for the first time in 2006, a Fair Trade stall.

However, the new format of the event sees students have a whole day off timetable, and all students in Year 7–10 attend three workshop sessions. Previous workshops have included origami, Bhangra dancing, magic, yoga and pizza making, amongst many more. Prefects and staff supervise individual workshops, whilst Senior Prefects oversee the smooth running of the event as a whole. Senior Prefects also decorate the quadrangle and piazza areas with flags and bunting to add to the festival atmosphere.

== School officers and prefects ==
Each year, Aston has a School Captain, a School Vice-Captain (or two/three Vice Captains) and a team of Senior Prefects who together help to run the school with the guidance of staff. The School Captain and Vice Captains are known as the School Officers. Every other student in Year 13 is a prefect, and approximately 20 are Senior Prefects. Each Senior Prefect leads a group of prefects in a variety of different tasks across the school including prefect duties and helping to organise events such as The Festival Of Cultures. Four House Captains are also appointed at the beginning of each year.

2018–2019 was the only academic year in which was no School Captain; instead, two Vice-Captains were elected.

Research in the school's Archive Centre has so far found the names of 100 holders of the post, stretching back to 1910.

== The Record ==
The Record is the school magazine. It is published annually and highlights key events of the school year. Volume II can be traced back to 1910.

== Old Edwardians ==
See also Category:People educated at King Edward VI Aston School.

- Ted Allbeury (1917–2005), British author of espionage fiction
- Gary Allen CBE, CEO of IMI plc from 1986–2001
- Walter Allen, literary critic
- Jon Bounds, blogger and humorist
- Sir Edgar Britten, Commodore of Cunard White Star Ltd from 1935–6
- Sir William Brockington CBE, Director of Education for Leicestershire from 1903–47
- Gareth Davies CBE, Chairman of Glynwed International plc from 1986–98
- Sir Edward Downes – Conductor
- Peter Fell, Teacher, social worker and author.
- Ronald Graham Gregory Foley – Bishop of Reading from 1982–9
- Bernard Ford MBE – With Diane Towler won four consecutive ice dancing world titles and four European championships in the 1960s
- Norman Hickin FRES, F.I.Biol., FZS. (1910-1990) – English entomologist
- Elliot Knight – British actor, best known for his role as Sinbad in 2012
- Derek J Lawden – Mathematician, Professor at Aston University, author of several books including one on space travel.
- Joe Morris, rugby union player
- John Nathan-Turner – Doctor Who producer.
- George Painter OBE – Author – 1925
- Sir Leonard Parsons, President of the British Paediatric Association from 1942–45
- Captain R. E. Phillips, VC
- Henry Reed – Poet and dramatist
- Les Ross MBE – Radio DJ
- Sir Maurice Shock – Educationalist
- Sir Harold Smith – Politician & Chairman, The Gas Council, Conservative MP for Warrington from 1910–22
- R. D. Smith – teacher, lecturer and radio producer
- Sir Ivan Stedeford GBE – Industrialist & Philanthropist, Chairman of TI Group from 1944–63
- Sir Henry Thomas – Keeper of Books, British Library
- Three Lords Mayor of Birmingham: Sir Ernest Canning; Sir Joseph Balmer; Sir Neville Bosworth
- Nick Timothy, former Downing Street Chief of Staff
