= Century =

Unit of time lasting 100 years

A century is a numerical value of 100 or more popularly period of 100 years. Centuries are numbered ordinally in English and many other languages. The word century comes from the Latin centum, meaning one hundred. Century is sometimes abbreviated as c. currently the 21st century is ongoing, started on first January 2000.

A centennial or centenary is a hundredth anniversary, or a celebration of this, typically the remembrance of an event which took place a hundred years earlier.

== Start and end of centuries ==
Although a century can mean any arbitrary period of 100 years, there are two viewpoints on the nature of standard centuries. One is based on strict construction, while the other is based on popular perception.

According to the strict construction, the 1st century AD, which began with AD 1, ended with AD 100, and the 2nd century with AD 200; (Note: AD and CE year numbering, which are numerically equivalent, are now commonly used to number years, including those which occurred before these notations were invented; AD did not become widespread in Europe until early in the 2nd millennium.) in this model, the n-th century starts with a year that follows a year with a multiple of 100 (except the first century as it began after the year 1 BC) and ends with the next coming year with a multiple of 100 (100n), i.e. the 20th century comprises the years 1901 to 2000, and the 21st century comprises the years 2001 to 2100 in strict usage.

In common perception and practice, centuries are structured by grouping years based on sharing the 'hundreds' digit(s). In this model, the n-th century starts with the year that ends in "00" and ends with the year ending in "99"; for example, in popular culture, the years 1900 to 1999 constitute the 20th century, and the years 2000 to 2099 constitute the 21st century. (This is similar to the grouping of "0-to-9 decades" which share the 'tens' digit.)

To facilitate calendrical calculations by computer, the astronomical year numbering and ISO 8601 systems both contain a year zero, with the astronomical year 0 corresponding to the year 1 BC, the astronomical year -1 corresponding to 2 BC, and so on.

Strict vs Popular usage
Year	2 BC	1 BC	1	2	...	99	100	101	102	...	199	200	201	202	...	1899	1900	1901	1902	...	1999	2000	2001	2002	...	2025	...	2099	2100	2101	2102	...
Strict	1st century BC		1st century					2nd century					3rd century		...	19th century		20th century					21st century							22nd century		...
Popular	1st century BC		1st century				2nd century					3rd century			...	19th century	20th century					21st century							22nd century			...

== Alternative naming systems ==
Informally, years may be referred to in groups based on the hundreds part of the year. In this system, the years 1900–1999 are referred to as the nineteen hundreds (1900s). Aside from English usage, this system is used in Swedish, Danish, Norwegian, Icelandic, Finnish and Hungarian. The Swedish nittonhundratalet (or 1900-talet), Danish nittenhundredetallet (or nittenhundredetallet), Norwegian nittenhundretallet (or 1900-tallet), Finnish tuhatyhdeksänsataaluku (or 1900-luku) and Hungarian ezerkilencszázas évek (or 1900-as évek) refer unambiguously to the years 1900–1999. In Swedish, however, a century is in more rare cases referred to as det n-te seklet/århundradet ("the n-th century") rather than n-hundratalet, i.e. the 17th century is (in rare cases) referred to as 17:(d)e/sjuttonde århundradet/seklet rather than 1600-talet and mainly also referring to the years 1601–1700 rather than 1600–1699; according to Svenska Akademiens ordbok, 16:(d)e/sextonde århundradet may refer to either the years 1501–1600 or 1500–1599.

Italian also has a similar system, but it only expresses the hundreds and omits the word for 'thousand'. This system mainly functions from the 11th to the 20th century:

il Quattrocento (that is 'the four hundred', the 15th century)
il Cinquecento (that is 'the five hundred', the 16th century).

These terms are often used in other languages when referring to the history of Italy.

== Similar dating units in other calendar systems ==
While the century has been commonly used in the West, other cultures and calendars have utilized differently sized groups of years in a similar manner. The Hindu calendar, in particular, summarizes its years into groups of 60, while the Aztec calendar considers groups of 52.

== See also ==
- Age of Discovery
- Ancient history
- Before Christ and Anno Domini
- Common Era
- Decade
- List of decades, centuries, and millennia
- Lustrum
- Middle Ages
- Millennium
- Modern era
- Saeculum
- Year

== Bibliography ==
- The Battle of the Centuries, Ruth Freitag, U.S. Government Printing Office. Available from the Superintendent of Documents, P.O. Box 371954, Pittsburgh, PA 15250- 7954. Cite stock no. 030-001-00153-9. Retrieved 3 March 2019.
