= Papyrus Oxyrhynchus 242 =

Greek papyrus fragment

Papyrus Oxyrhynchus 242 (P. Oxy. 242 or P. Oxy. II 242) is an official notice to the agoranomos to register a sale, written in Greek. It was discovered in Oxyrhynchus. The manuscript was written on papyrus in the form of a sheet. It is dated to 8 December 77. Currently it is housed in the University Library of Graz in Austria.

== Description ==
This document is one of three, along with P. Oxy. 241 and P. Oxy. 243, which follow a legal formula that has not been found outside of the Oxyrhynchan administrative area. These three documents involve mortgages of slaves, land, or houses. The salient difference is that these three documents are addressed to the agoranomeion (the office of the agoranomoi) rather than an office generally (γραΦείον). This indicates that in Oxyrhynchus, the agoranomeion functioned as a repository for records.

The papyrus contains an official notification to the agoranomos to register a contract for the sale of some land. With this notification is a receipt from a banker for sales tax paid. The seller is a woman named Thermouthion, who, with her husband as guardian, had agreed to sell some land in the neighborhood of the temple of Sarapis to some priests. The contract stipulates that the land should remain dedicated to the god and not be resold or used as a source of income.

Both this papyrus and the next one in the series, P.Oxy. 243, are extremely important as they allow the value of Ptolemaic copper coinage in silver to be calculated. This document states the price paid for the land in both metals. The ratio established is 1 silver drachma to 450 copper drachmae.

The measurements of the fragment are 237 by 115 mm.

It was discovered by Grenfell and Hunt in 1897 in Oxyrhynchus. The text was published by Grenfell and Hunt in 1899.

== See also ==
- Oxyrhynchus Papyri
