= Papyrus Oxyrhynchus 47 =

Ancient Greek manuscript

Papyrus Oxyrhynchus 47 (P. Oxy. 47) is about a land distribution (καταλοχισμός) and written by Achilleus, the agent of Pyrrhus (the superintendent of καταλοχισμοί for all of Egypt), in the Greek language. The manuscript was written on papyrus in the form of a sheet. It was discovered by Grenfell and Hunt in 1897 in Oxyrhynchus. The document was written between 83 and 88. It is housed in the British Library (750) in London. The text was published by Grenfell and Hunt in 1898.

The letter is similar to Oxyrhynchus 45 and Oxyrhynchus 46. The measurements of the fragment are 146 by 66 mm. The character of the handwriting is of the late first century, which dates the document to the early part of Domitian's reign.

== See also ==
- Oxyrhynchus Papyri
- Papyrus Oxyrhynchus 46
- Papyrus Oxyrhynchus 48
