= Papyrus Oxyrhynchus 238 =

Greek papyrus fragment

Papyrus Oxyrhynchus 238 (P. Oxy. 238 or P. Oxy. II 238) is a notice issued by an official, presumably the strategos, and written in Greek. It was discovered in Oxyrhynchus. The manuscript was written on papyrus in the form of a sheet. It is dated between 29 August and 27 September 72. Currently it is housed in the Trinity College Library in Dublin.

== Description ==
The notice orders all people who had deposited business documents which were still "meteoroi" (μετέωροι) to appear before the agoranomi and complete the documents. The meaning of the word "μετέωροι" is obscure as applied to contracts but it seems to mean "incompleted." This manuscript sheds some light on the organization of repositories of public records in Oxyrhynchus as opposed to in Faiyum. The handwriting is a large, clear semi-uncial script. The measurements of the fragment are 194 by 96 mm.

It was discovered by Grenfell and Hunt in 1897 in Oxyrhynchus. The text was published by Grenfell and Hunt in 1899.

== See also ==
- Oxyrhynchus Papyri
