= Papyrus Oxyrhynchus 241 =

Greek papyrus fragment

Papyrus Oxyrhynchus 241 (P. Oxy. 241 or P. Oxy. II 241) is an authorization to the agoranomos asking him to register a loan. It is written in Greek and discovered in Oxyrhynchus. The manuscript was written on papyrus in the form of a sheet. It is dated to the late first century. Currently it is housed in the Princeton University Library.

== Description ==
This document is one of three, along with P. Oxy. 242 and P. Oxy. 243, which follow a legal formula that has not been found outside of the Oxyrhynchan administrative area. These three documents involve mortgages of slaves, land, or houses. The salient difference is that these three documents are addressed to the agoranomeion (the office of the agoranomoi) rather than an office generally (γραΦείον). This indicates that in Oxyrhynchus, the agoranomeion functioned as a repository for records.

Papyrus Oxyrhynchus 241 is an authorization from Caecilius Clemens to the agoranomos to register a loan of money from Thonis to his brother on the security of a share in a house. The measurements of the fragment are 193 by 66 mm.

It was discovered by Grenfell and Hunt in 1897 in Oxyrhynchus. The text was published by Grenfell and Hunt in 1899.

== Text ==
Caecilius Clemens to the agoranomos, greeting. Register a contract of loan from Thonis, son of Harpaësis, son of Petserothonis, his mother being Petosiris, daughter of Harpaësis, of the city of Oxyrhynchus, chief bearer in the temple of Thoëris and Isis and Sarapis and Osiris and the associated most mighty gods, on the security of the third part of a house, in which there is a hall, with the court and entrances and exits and appurtenances, situated in the Gymnasium square quarter by the temple of Osiris and the treasury, which was mortgaged to him by his full brother Thompuas in return for an accommodation in accordance with a note of hand and a payment through a bank of 400 drachmae...and...

== See also ==
- Oxyrhynchus Papyri
