= Papyrus Oxyrhynchus 49 =

Letter written in Greek

Papyrus Oxyrhynchus 49 (P. Oxy. 49) is a letter concerning the emancipation of a slave, written in Greek. The manuscript was written on papyrus in the form of a sheet. It was discovered by Grenfell and Hunt in 1897 in Oxyrhynchus. The document was written on 28 October 100. It is housed in the library of Trinity College (Pap. E 1) in Dublin. The text was published by Grenfell and Hunt in 1898.

The measurements of the fragment are 186 by 70 mm. The letter was written by two bankers, both named Theon, to the agoranomi of Oxyrhynchus, requesting the freedom of a slave named Horion, for whom 10 drachmae of silver and 2 talents, 6,000 drachmae of copper had been paid.

The papyrus was written by the same hand as Papyrus Oxyrhynchus 50 and probably refers to the same transaction.

== See also ==
- Oxyrhynchus Papyri
- Papyrus Oxyrhynchus 48
- Papyrus Oxyrhynchus 50
