= Papyrus Oxyrhynchus 48 =

Ancient Greek manuscript

Papyrus Oxyrhynchus 48 (P. Oxy. 48) is a letter asking for the emancipation of a slave, written in the Greek language on 16 October 86. The document was written on papyrus in the form of a sheet. It was discovered by Grenfell and Hunt in 1897 in Oxyrhynchus. It is housed in the Vaughan Library at Harrow School. The text was published by Grenfell and Hunt in 1898.

The measurements of the fragment are 157 by 95 mm. The letter was written by Chaeremon to the agoranomus of Oxyrhynchus, requesting him to grant freedom to a female slave named Euphrosyne.

== See also ==
- Oxyrhynchus Papyri
- Papyrus Oxyrhynchus 47
- Papyrus Oxyrhynchus 49
- Papyrus Oxyrhynchus 50
