= Pumayyaton =

Pumayyaton (Phoenician: 𐤐𐤌𐤉𐤉𐤕𐤍, PMYYTN 'Pummay has given'; Ancient Greek: Πυγμαλίων, Pugmaliōn; Latin: Pygmalion) may refer to:

- Pygmalion of Tyre, Phoenician king of Tyre
- Pumayyaton, king of Kition and Idalion, mentioned in the Pumayyaton and Pnytarion's inscriptions
