= Graham Foley =

The Rt Revd Graham Foley
- Bishop of Reading
- Diocese: Diocese of Oxford
- In office: 1982–1989
- Predecessor: Eric Wild
- Successor: John Bone
- Other posts: Area bishop of Reading (1984–1989); Honorary assistant bishop in York (1989–2007)

Orders
- Ordination: c. 1950 (deacon); 1951 (priest)
- Consecration: 1982

Personal details
- Born: 13 June 1923 Cheadle Hulme, Cheshire, England
- Died: 30 July 2017 (aged 94)
- Denomination: Anglican
- Parents: Theodore & Cessan Page
- Spouse: Florence Redman (m. 1944)
- Children: 2 sons; 2 daughters
- Education: King's College London

Ronald Graham Gregory Foley (13 June 1923 – 30 July 2017) was an Anglican clergyman who was Bishop of Reading from 1982 to 1989 and the first area bishop under Oxford diocese's 1984 area scheme.

Foley was educated at Wakefield Grammar, King Edward VI Aston and King's College London. Ordained in 1951, he began his career with a curacy at South Shore, Blackpool after which he was Vicar of St Luke, Blackburn. In 1960, he became Director of Education for the Diocese of Durham followed by a decade at Leeds Parish Church and his final appointment (before his elevation to the episcopate) was as a chaplain to Elizabeth II. In retirement he has served the Church as an honorary assistant bishop within the Diocese of York – he lives in the diocese 'til his death, but his commission as a bishop there reportedly ended in 2007. Foley died in July 2017 at the age of 94.

Church of England titles
Preceded by Eric Wild	Bishop of Reading; 1982–1989	Succeeded by John Bone
