= Russell Norman (disambiguation) =

Russell Norman may refer to:

- Russell Norman (1965–2023), English restaurateur, food writer
- Russel Norman (born 1967), New Zealand politician and environmentalist

== See also ==
- Norman Russell (born 1942), British clergyman
