= Bounder =

Bounder may refer to:

- Bounder (character), a dishonorable man
- Bounder (comics), a character from DC Comics
- Bounder (video game), a 1985 computer game
- The Bounder, a television show
- Myasishchev M-50 (NATO reporting name "Bounder"), a Soviet Union prototype bomber aircraft
- Pseudonym of Jon Bounds
