= Olivia Graham =

British bishop (born 1956)

The Right Reverend Olivia Graham
- Bishop of Reading
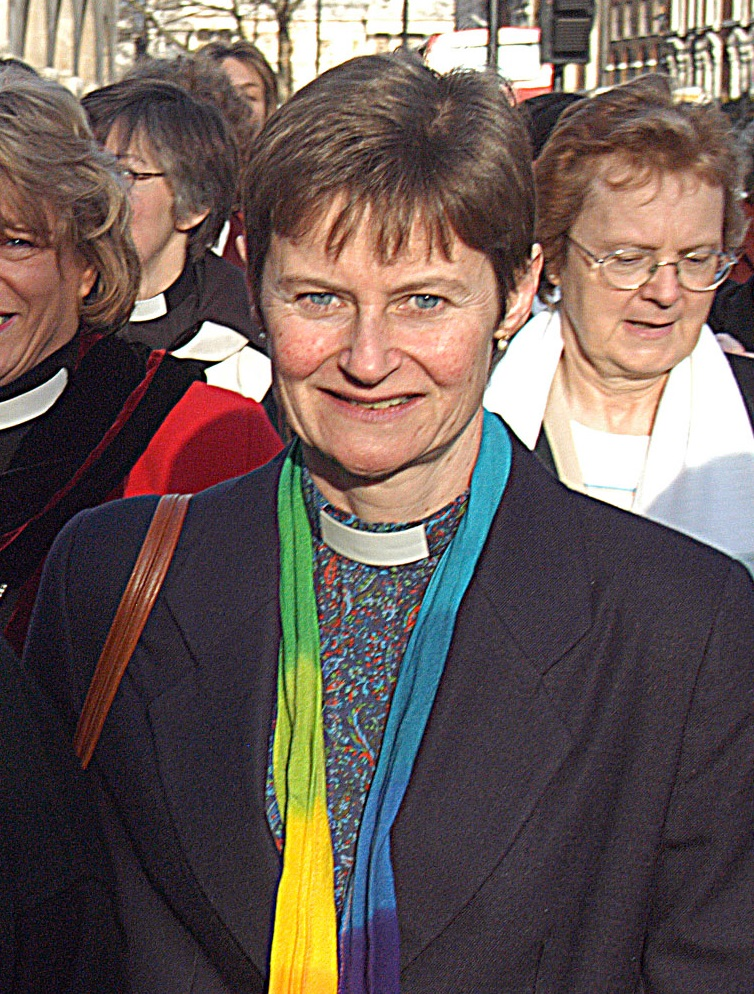
- Graham in 2005
- Diocese: Diocese of Oxford
- In office: November 2019 – September 2024
- Predecessor: Andrew Proud
- Successor: Mary Gregory
- Other post: Archdeacon of Berkshire (2013–2019)

Orders
- Ordination: 1997 (deacon); 1998 (priest)
- Consecration: 19 November 2019 by Justin Welby

Personal details
- Born: Olivia Josephine Graham; 21 June 1956 (age 70)
- Denomination: Anglicanism
- Education: University of East Anglia

Olivia Josephine Graham (born 21 June 1956) is a British retired bishop. She served as Bishop of Reading, a suffragan bishop in the Diocese of Oxford, from 2019 until 2024; she was previously Archdeacon of Berkshire in the same diocese from 2013 to 2019.

== Early life and education ==
Graham was born on 21 June 1956. She was educated at Cobham Hall School, an all-girls private school in Cobham, Kent, and at Stake Farm College, also in Kent.

From 1974 to 1981, she was a teacher in Africa. She then returned to England to study at the University of East Anglia, graduating with a Bachelor of Arts (BA) degree in 1984. She moved into international development; working for the United Nations from 1984 to 1986 and for Oxfam from 1986 to 1993.

== Ordained ministry ==
Graham trained for ordained ministry on the St Albans and Oxford Ministry Course, from 1994 to 1997, completing a Certificate of Theology (CTh). She was made deacon at Michaelmas 1997 (5 October), by Richard Harries, Bishop of Oxford, at Christ Church Cathedral, Oxford. She was ordained as priest the following Michaelmas (4 October 1998) by Mike Hill, area Bishop of Buckingham, at All Saints', High Wycombe. She was appointed Archdeacon of Berkshire in 2013.

=== Episcopal ministry ===
On 15 July 2019, the announcement was made that Graham was to become Bishop of Reading, a suffragan bishop of the Diocese of Oxford. On 19 November 2019, she was consecrated a bishop by Justin Welby during a service at St Paul's Cathedral. As area bishop, she oversees the Reading episcopal area. This is identical to the Archdeaconry of Berkshire she previously oversaw as archdeacon.

In February 2024, Graham announced that she would retire as Bishop of Reading on 30 September 2024.

=== Views ===
In November 2022, Graham tweeted that she agreed with Steven Croft's call that clergy in the Church of England should be free to bless or marry same-sex partners and to enter into a same-sex marriage themselves. This is in contrast to the Church's current official position.

In November 2023, she was one of 44 Church of England bishops who signed an open letter supporting the use of the Prayers of Love and Faith (i.e. blessings for same-sex couples) and called for "Guidance being issued without delay that includes the removal of all restrictions on clergy entering same-sex civil marriages, and on bishops ordaining and licensing such clergy".

== Personal life ==
In 1989, Graham married Keith Malcolm Glenny. Together they have three children: one daughter and two sons.

Church of England titles
Preceded by Norman Russell	Archdeacon of Berkshire; 2013 to 2019	Succeeded by Stephen Pullin
Preceded by Andrew Proud	Bishop of Reading; 2019 to 2024	Succeeded by Mary Gregory
