= Papyrus Oxyrhynchus 57 =

Greek letter written in 195 or 196

Papyrus Oxyrhynchus 57 (P. Oxy. 57) is a letter relating to a peculation by a treasury official, written in Greek. The manuscript was written on papyrus in the form of a sheet. It was discovered by Grenfell and Hunt in 1897 in Oxyrhynchus. The document was written between 195 and 196 CE. It is housed at Johns Hopkins University. The text was published by Grenfell and Hunt in 1898.

The letter was addressed to Apion, ex-strategus of the Antaeopolite nome, with request for the payment of a sum of money left unpaid by one of Apion's former subordinates. It was written by Aurelius Apolinarius, a strategus of the Oxyrhynchus nome. The measurements of the fragment are 270 by 91 mm.

== See also ==
- Oxyrhynchus Papyri
- Papyrus Oxyrhynchus 56
- Papyrus Oxyrhynchus 58
