= Andrew Proud =

British Anglican bishop

The Right Reverend Andrew Proud
- area Bishop of Reading
- Church: Church of England
- Diocese: Diocese of Oxford
- In office: 2011–2019
- Predecessor: Stephen Cottrell
- Successor: Olivia Graham
- Other post: area Bishop of the Horn of Africa (2007–2011)

Orders
- Ordination: 1980 (deacon); 1981 (priest) by John Trillo (deacon); Roderic Coote (priest)
- Consecration: late April 2007 by see below

Personal details
- Born: 27 March 1954 (age 72)
- Denomination: Anglican
- Residence: Tidmarsh, Berkshire
- Spouse: (m. 1977)
- Children: 2
- Education: King's College London; School of Oriental and African Studies

Andrew John Proud (born 27 March 1954) is a retired British Anglican bishop. He was area Bishop of Reading in the Church of England (Diocese of Oxford) and previously the area bishop for the Horn of Africa in the Episcopal Church in Jerusalem and the Middle East (Diocese of Egypt).

== Early life and education ==
Proud was born on 27 March 1954. He graduated from King's College London's Theological Department in 1979 with a Bachelor of Divinity (BD) degree and an Associateship of King's College (AKC), then trained for ministry at Lincoln Theological College for a year. Proud undertook a Master of Arts (MA) degree at the School of Oriental and African Studies, London, from 2001 to 2002.

== Ordained ministry ==
Proud was made a deacon at Petertide 1980 (29 June) by John Trillo, Bishop of Chelmsford, at Chelmsford Cathedral, and began his ministry with a three-year curacy at St Mary's, Stansted Mountfitchet, Essex. At Petertide 1981 (28 June) he was ordained a priest by Roderic Coote, Bishop of Colchester, at St Andrew's, Halstead. In 1983, he became Team Vicar of Borehamwood, Hertfordshire, until 1990, when he moved to Bishop's Hatfield, where he was an assistant priest in the team ministry until 1992. From that point until 2001, he was rector at St Mary's, East Barnet, Greater London, before he returned to university for postgraduate study.

Proud relocated to Addis Ababa, Ethiopia, to be chaplain at St Matthew's Church in 2002. While there, he was made an assistant to the bishop for the Horn of Africa area in 2004 and a canon of All Saints' Cathedral, Cairo, in 2005.

=== Episcopal ministry ===
Between 2007 and 2011, he was the area bishop for a new episcopal area (called the Horn of Africa, consisting of Ethiopia, Eritrea, Djibouti, Somaliland and Somalia) in the Episcopal Church in Jerusalem and the Middle East Diocese of Egypt (based in Addis Ababa). He was ordained and consecrated a bishop for that see in late April 2007, at St Matthew's Addis Ababa, by three president bishops of the church: Ghais Malik, retired Bishop of Egypt; Clive Handford, retiring Bishop in Cyprus; and Mouneer Anis, Bishop of Egypt and President Bishop-elect.

On 17 January 2011, the British Government announced Proud's appointment as the Bishop of Reading, one of three suffragan/area bishops in the Diocese of Oxford. He was installed at Reading Minster on 16 April 2011. As Bishop of Reading, his official residence was in Tidmarsh, Berkshire.

Proud retired on 1 May 2019. In retirement, he has been licensed an honorary assistant bishop in the Diocese of Peterborough since 2019.

== Views ==
Proud has described his theological views as "conservative" and "fairly traditional". He believes marriage is between a man and woman and is for the purpose of procreation. He supports the ordination of women as priests and bishops.

== Styles ==
- The Reverend Andrew Proud (1980–2005)
- The Reverend Canon Andrew Proud (2005–2007)
- The Right Reverend Andrew Proud (2007–present)

Church of England titles
| Preceded by Stephen Cottrell | Bishop of Reading; 2011–2019 | Succeeded by Olivia Graham |
