= Joe Morris (rugby union) =

English rugby union player (born 1998)

- Born: Joseph Liam Morris; 8 May 1998 (age 28) Sutton Coldfield, England
- Height: 1.78 m (5 ft 10 in)
- Weight: 116 kg (256 lb; 18 st 4 lb)
- School: King Edward VI Aston School
- University: St Edmund Hall, Oxford

Rugby union career
- Position: Tighthead Prop
- Current team: Worcester Warriors
Amateur team(s)
| Years | Team | Apps | (Points) |
| 2017–2018 | Oxford University RFC | | |
| 2017-2018 | Henley Hawks | | |
Senior career
| Years | Team | Apps | (Points) |
| 2018– | Worcester Warriors | 5 | (0) |
| 2018–2019 | → Hartpury University | 12 | (0) |
| 2018–2019 | → Yorkshire Carnegie | 2 | (0) |
- Correct as of 11 November 2020
International career
| Years | Team | Apps | (Points) |
| 2014 | England U16s | | |
| 2015–2016 | England U17s | | |
| 2015–2016 | England U18s | | |
| 2016–2018 | England U20s | 3 | (0) |
- Correct as of 18 November 2020

Joe Morris (born 8 May 1998) is an English rugby union player who plays for Worcester Warriors in the Premiership Rugby.

== Early life ==
Morris, who went to King Edward VI Aston School, joined Worcester Warriors at Under 16 level and played for the Under 18s, helping them to a fifth-place finish as they beat Exeter Chiefs in the Premiership Rugby Under 18 Academy Finals Day in 2016. Morris has represented Greater Birmingham and North Midlands county sides.

Morris played for Oxford University RFC, as well as Henley Hawks in National League 2 South during the 2017–18 season. Having won Blues for Oxford in 2016 and 2018, Morris graduated with a degree in Biomedical Science from St Edmund Hall, Oxford.

== Club career ==
Joe Morris joined the Warriors Senior Academy set-up in the summer of 2016 and played eight times for Worcester Cavaliers in the 2017/18 Premiership Rugby A League season, as he helped the side to a third-place finish in their Northern Conference. On 30 April 2019, Morris signed his first professional contract with Worcester, thus promoted to the senior squad ahead of the 2019–20 season.

Morris made his senior debut as a second-half replacement in the Premiership Rugby Cup match against Exeter Chiefs at Sixways Stadium in October 2019. and also came off the bench in the European Rugby Challenge Cup win over Enisei-STM in Russia back in November 2019. Morris made his Premiership debut came as a replacement against Wasps at the Ricoh Arena in August 2020.

He also gained valuable senior experience playing for Hartpury University in the RFU Championship in 2018-19 and 2019–20 seasons and also played for Yorkshire Carnegie on a dual registration during the 2018–19 season.

== International career ==
Morris represented England Under 16s through under 18s and also played against France Under 17s for England Academies in 2015. Morris made four appearances for England U20s in the 2018 Six Nations Under 20 Championship, debuting in the opener against Italy held at Stadio Enzo Bearzot, Italy.
