= John Bone (bishop) =

- Bishop of Reading
- Diocese: Diocese of Oxford
- In office: 1989–1996
- Predecessor: Graham Foley
- Successor: Dominic Walker
- Other posts: Honorary assistant bishop in Oxford (1996–present); Archdeacon of Buckingham (1978–1989)

Orders
- Ordination: 1956 (deacon); c. 1957 (priest)
- Consecration: 1989

Personal details
- Born: 28 August 1930
- Died: 5 July 2014 (aged 83)
- Denomination: Anglican
- Parents: Jack & Herberta
- Spouse: Ruth Crudgington (m. 1954)
- Children: 3 sons; 2 daughters
- Education: St Peter's College, Oxford

John Frank Ewan Bone (28 August 1930 – 5 July 2014) was the area Bishop of Reading (Church of England) from 1989 until 1996.

He was educated at Monkton Combe School and St Peter's College, Oxford (gaining an Oxford Master of Arts {MA Oxon}) before embarking on an ecclesiastical career with a curacy at St Gabriel's, Warwick Square. After incumbencies at Datchet and Slough he was appointed Rural Dean of Burnham and then (his final appointment before ordination to the episcopacy) Archdeacon of Buckingham.

He died in 2014: his Church Times obituary stated that he was

"a great example of the quiet, reliable bishop who was trusted by many, worked hard, and never sought the limelight. "

Church of England titles
| Preceded by Graham Foley | Bishop of Reading; 1989–1996 | Succeeded by Dominic Walker |
