= Norman Hickin =

English entomologist (1910–1990)

Norman Hickin FRES, F.I.Biol., FZS
- Undated image of Hickin
- Born: 1910; Aston
- Died: 6 December 1990
- Education: King Edward VI Aston School, Aston University, University of London
- Occupations: Writer, entomologist, scientific collector
- Awards: Fellow of the Royal Entomological Society; Fellow of the Institute of Biology; Fellow of the Zoological Society of London

Signature
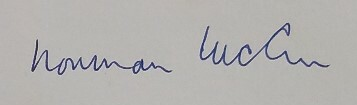

Norman Ernest Hickin (1910–1990) was an English entomologist and author, with a professional interest in insect pests, having worked for most of his career for Rentokil. He collected the types of several species new to science.

== Early life ==
Norman Hickin was born in 1910 in Aston, Warwickshire (Note: In 1912, Aston became part of Birmingham), and educated at King Edward VI Grammar School, Aston and then Birmingham's Central Technical College (Note: Later Aston University), from where he graduated in 1936 with a BSc. in zoology with special entomology. He gained a PhD from London University in 1940, on an externship, with a thesis on spider beetles (Ptinidae).

During World War II he worked for Dunlop on the development of self-sealing fuel tanks for aircraft.

== Career ==
In 1944, Hickin joined Rentokil, where he was to remain for 27 years, retiring as Scientific Director. He continued to work for them as a consultant for the rest of his life. As of 2025, Rentokil describe his contribution thus:

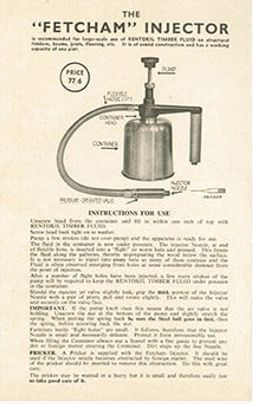
Advertisement for a Fetcham Injector, for woodworm eradication

his expertise in wood-boring beetles, coupled with his talent for public speaking and technical writing, played a crucial role in building the Rentokil brand.

Dr Hickin developed an applicator with a fine nozzle to inject fluid into beetle holes in timber. This was patented in 1948 and sold as the Fetcham Injector and a smaller Junior Injector. Sales boomed to such an extent that by the end of the 1950s over one million had been sold.

He was also a consultant to the British Wood Preserving Association, and an expert witness for court cases about termites, carpet moths, and other insect damage.

He wrote scientific works on caddis flies (having taken up the study of their larvae on the advice of Norman Denbigh Riley of the then British Museum's Natural History section), technical books about insect pests, and a number of popular books and newspaper columns on insects and general natural history, especially relating to the Wyre Forest, where he had a cottage. His writing was published both locally, in the Kidderminster Shuttle and more widely, in titles including The Irish Times and New Scientist. He illustrated some of his own works, as well as Derek Jones' Country Book.

He made a number of appearances on BBC programmes, including as a guest, discussing moths, on an episode of Woman's Hour in 1949, as a panellist on Domestic Forum in 1961, discussing gardening, and in his own television programme about the Wyre Forest, One Man's Forest, broadcast posthumously in 1991.

Hicking collected specimens in various countries, for collections including those of Ewell Technical College and the British Natural History Museum, several of which were insect types. He was appointed a director of Ewell by London University.

=== Galapagos dispute ===
In December 1972 Hickin wrote a letter to The Times (Note: Hickin gave his address as Kateshill, Bewdley, Worcestershire) in which he was highly critical of methods used by the Charles Darwin Research Station in the Galápagos Islands. The Charles Darwin Foundation, which managed the station, was in turn critical of Hickin. Later, however, the station's director, Craig G. MacFarland, acknowledged:

Roger Perry and I handled Dr. Hickin pretty roughly in a radio discussion. This seemed necessary at the time but I have felt vaguely uncomfortable about it ever since as some of his strictures were justified

and that some of the changes Hickin had encouraged had been incorporated into the station's management plan. The foundation promoted Hickin's 1980 book, Animal Life of the Galápagos, by way of an apology.

== Personal life ==
Hickin married Emma. The couple shared their love of natural history with their daughters Verney and Sari, and on an April 1957 family camping trip in the Wyre Forest Sari found a terrestrial caddis fly, Enoicyla pusilla, in their tent; the first specimen found in the forest in a century.

Hickin's autobiography, Forest Refreshed: Autobiographical Notes of a Biologist, was published in 1965.

He was a founding member, in 1964, of the Society of Wildlife Artists. and in 1968, of the Worcestershire Wildlife Trust.

Hickin died on 6 December 1990 aged 80. An obituary was published in Antenna, the journal of the Royal Entomological Society.

== Recognition and legacy ==
Hickin was a Fellow of the Royal Entomological Society (FRES), Fellow of the Institute of Biology (F.I.Biol.), and a Fellow of the Zoological Society of London (FZS).

Nine of his manuscript diaries and notebooks, dating between 1937 and 1957, are held in the National History Museum, London. His correspondence with Colbran J. Wainwright is held by the Royal Entomological Society London.

A collection of Hickin's specimens was rediscovered in the Wyre Forest in September 2000, in the possession of English Nature, and subsequently catalogued. Also included were specimens collected by others and supplied to or acquired by Hickin. Many were from the forest, but other sites in the region were also represented.

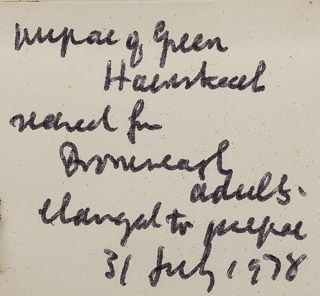
Specimen label from Norman Hickin's collection of Irish Lepidoptera, describing Green Hairstreak pupae

Seventy boxes of his Irish lepidoptera specimens, formerly in the possession of his daughter Verney, were offered for sale online in the 2020s.

== Selected bibliography ==
- Caddis: A Short Account of the Biology of British Caddis Flies With Special Reference to the Immature Stages. Methuen Field Study Books. 1952. (with "4 colour plates and b/w line drawings by the author")
- The Insect Factor in Wood Decay. Hutchinson. 1963.
- Forest Refreshed: Autobiographical Notes of a Biologist. Hutchinson. 1965.
- Caddis Larvae: Larvae of the British Trichoptera. Hutchinson. 1967.
- African Notebook: The Notes of a Biologist in East Africa. Hutchinson. 1969.
- The Natural History of an English Forest: the Wild Life of Wyre. Hutchinson. 1971. ISBN 978-0-09-104230-1.
- Animal life of the Galapagos: An Illustrated Guide for Visitors. Ferendune Books. 1980. ISBN 978-0-906604-05-2.
- Hickin, Norman (1992). The Butterflies of Ireland: A Field Guide. Ireland: Schull. ISBN 978-1-879373-01-3.
- Longhorn Beetles of the British Isles. Shire Publications. 1999. ISBN 978-0-85263-897-2.

=== As illustrator ===
- Jones, Derek (1975). Derek Jones' Country Book. David and Charles. ISBN 978-0-7153-6963-0.
