= Papyrus Oxyrhynchus 40 =

Ancient Greek manuscript

Papyrus Oxyrhynchus 40 (P. Oxy. 40) is a report of a legal decision of the praefect Eudaemon, written by an unknown author in Greek. It was discovered by Grenfell and Hunt in 1897 in Oxyrhynchus. The document is dated to the late second or the late third century. It is housed in the Cambridge University Library (Add. Ms. 4032) in Cambridge. The text was published by Grenfell and Hunt in 1898.

The manuscript was written on papyrus in the form of a sheet. The measurements of the fragment are 187 by 148 mm.

== See also ==
- Oxyrhynchus Papyri
- Papyrus Oxyrhynchus 39
- Papyrus Oxyrhynchus 41
