= Pumayyaton and Pnytarion's inscriptions =

Two separated inscriptions on a marble base found near Kition

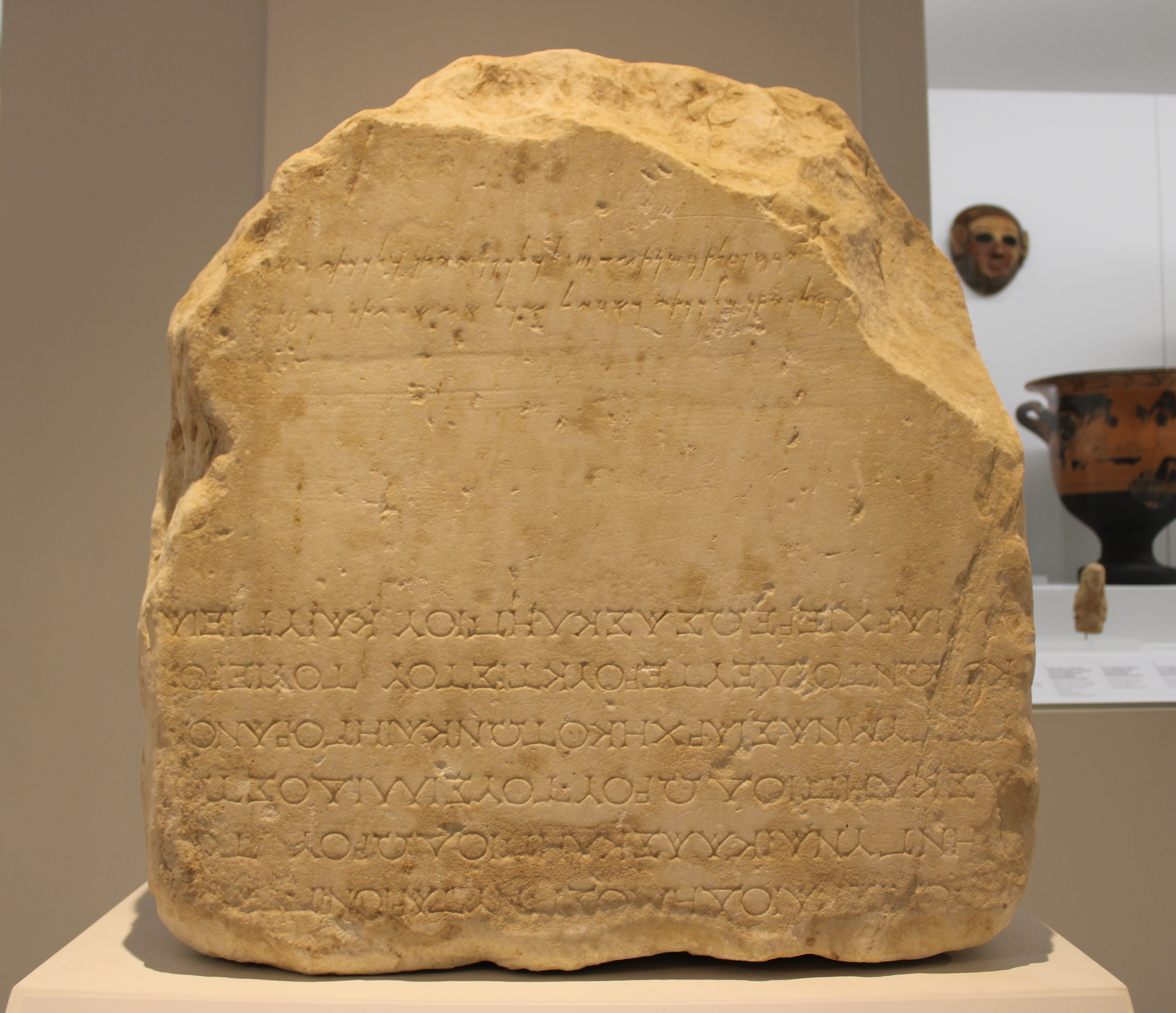
The marble base with the two inscriptions

The Pumayyaton and Pnytarion's inscriptions are two separated inscriptions, Phoenician and Greek, engraved on the same marble base which was found in Gdhi or Gai locality near Dromolaxia. About 3 hundred years after the first inscription, the Phoenician, was engraved, the base was turned upside down and the second inscription, in Greek, was engraved; the inscriptions have no connection and are not a bilingual inscription. Eventually, it was used as a press. It is now exhibited in Larnaca District Archaeological Museum.

== Pumayyaton inscription ==
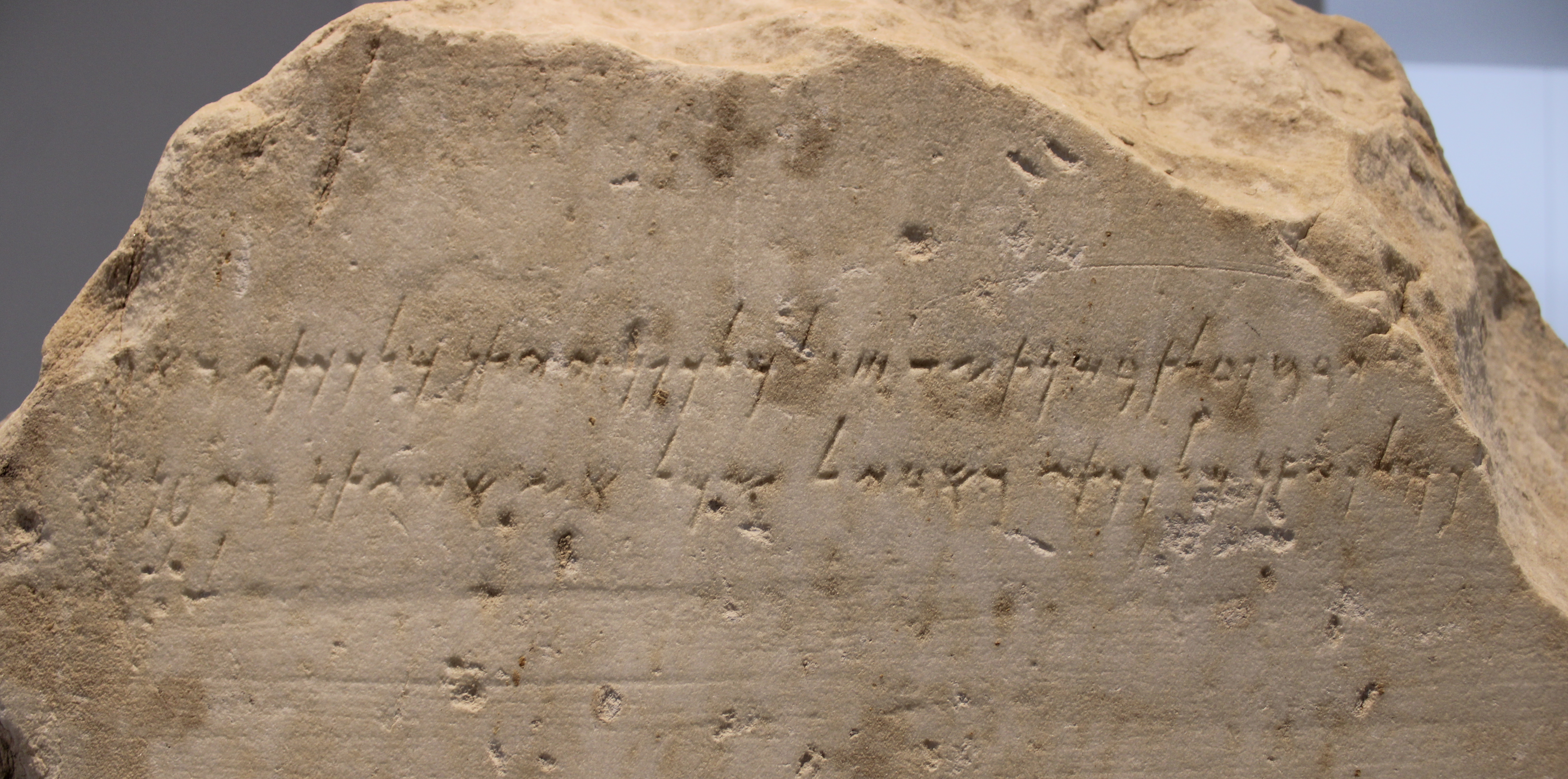
The Phoenician inscription

The inscription mentioning Pumayyaton, king of Kition and Idalion, dedicates a statue in the 34th year of the king's reign:

[בימם X]𐤋𐤉𐤓𐤇 𐤐𐤏𐤋𐤕 𐤁𐤔𐤍𐤕 𐤘𐤗𐤛𐤖 𐤋𐤌𐤋𐤊 𐤐𐤌𐤉𐤉𐤕𐤍 𐤌𐤋𐤊 𐤊𐤕𐤉 𐤅𐤀𐤃[𐤉𐤋]
[bymm X]lyrḥ pʿlt bšnt 20+10+3+1 lmlk pmyytn mlk kty wʾd[yl]
[In day X] of the month P'LT in the 34th year of King Pumayyaton, king of Kition and Ida[lion]
[𐤁𐤍 𐤌𐤋]𐤊 𐤌𐤋𐤊𐤉𐤕𐤍 𐤌𐤋𐤊 𐤊𐤕𐤉 𐤅𐤀𐤃𐤉𐤋 𐤎𐤌𐤋 𐤀𐤆 𐤀𐤔 𐤉𐤕𐤍 𐤅𐤉𐤈𐤍𐤀[...]
[bn ml]k mlkytn mlk kty wʾdyl sml ʾz ʾš ytn wyṭnʾ[...]
[son of kin]g Milkyaton, king of Kition and Idalion, this image which gave and erected[...]

The 34th year of Pumayyaton's reign, based on evidence concerning his rule over Tamassos, is c. 328 BC.

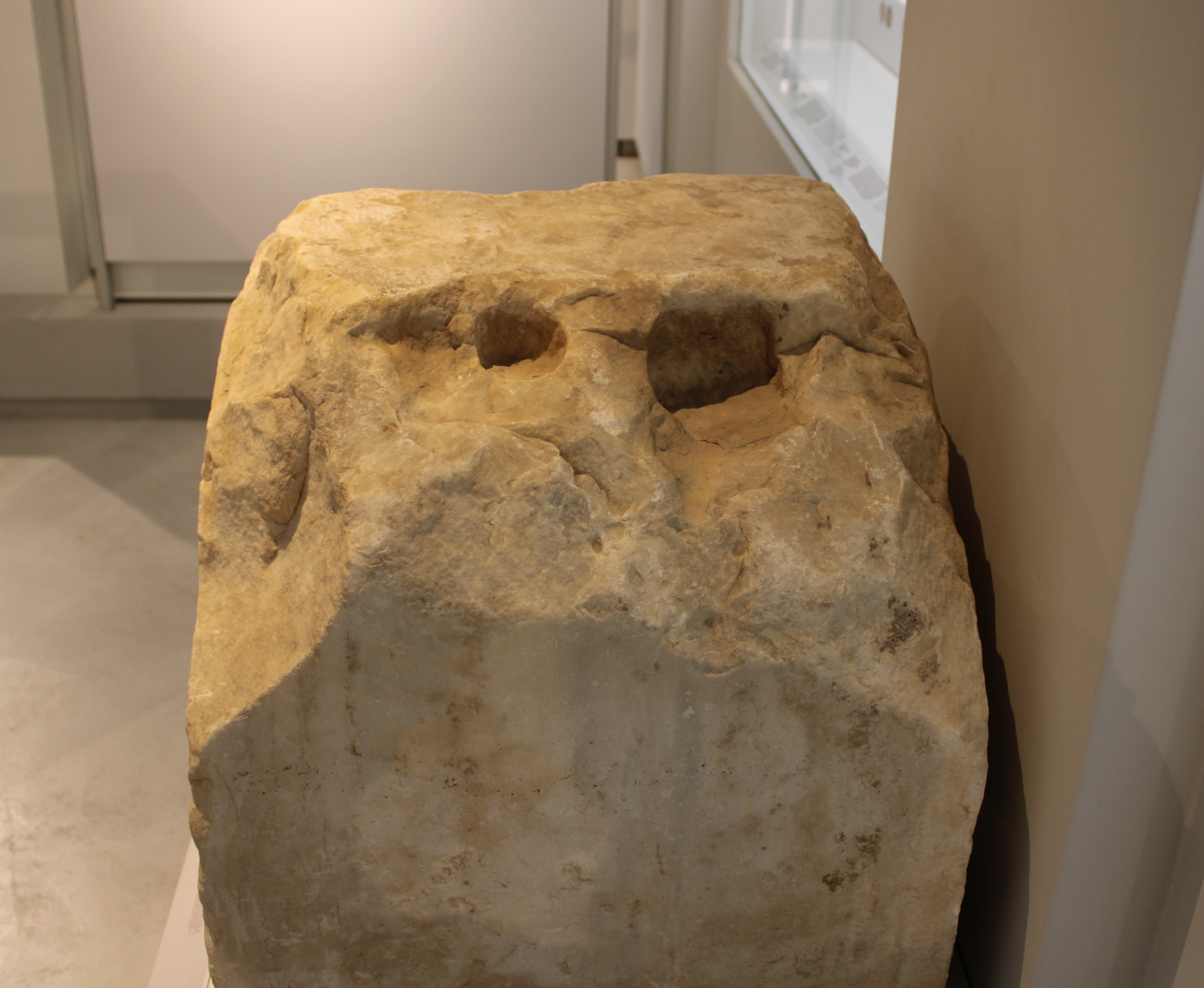
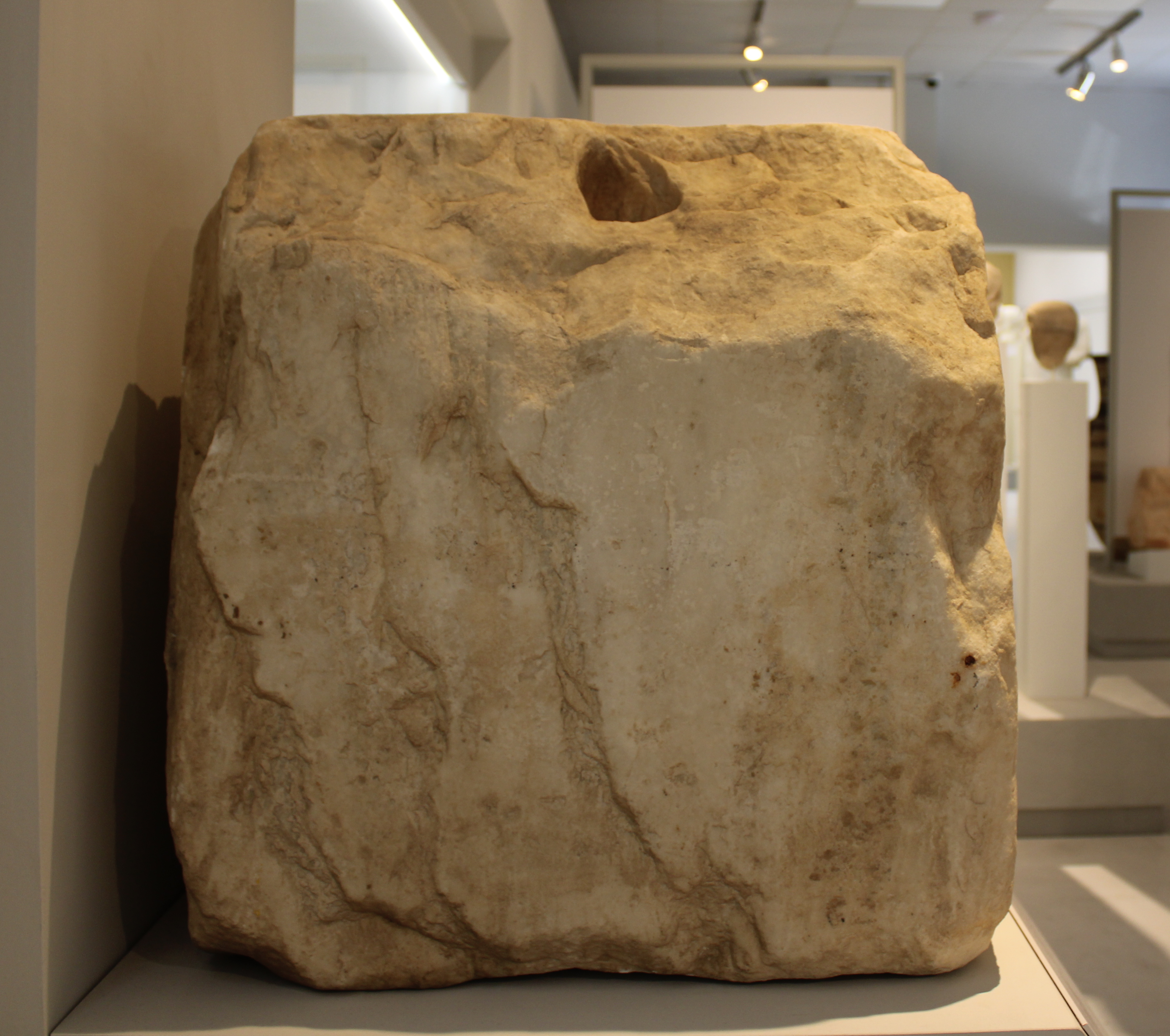
Both sides of the base, stands in the orientation in which the Phoenician inscription was engraved; the three mortises to which a bronze statue was fixed can be seen

In the classical period, Phoenician dedications of statues were engraved on marble bases, but the statues themselves are now lost; only traces on the upper part of the bases can indicate whether the statue was made of marble or of bronze. The statue dedicated in this Phoenician inscription was a bronze statue, fixed to the base with three deep mortises.

== Pnytarion inscription ==
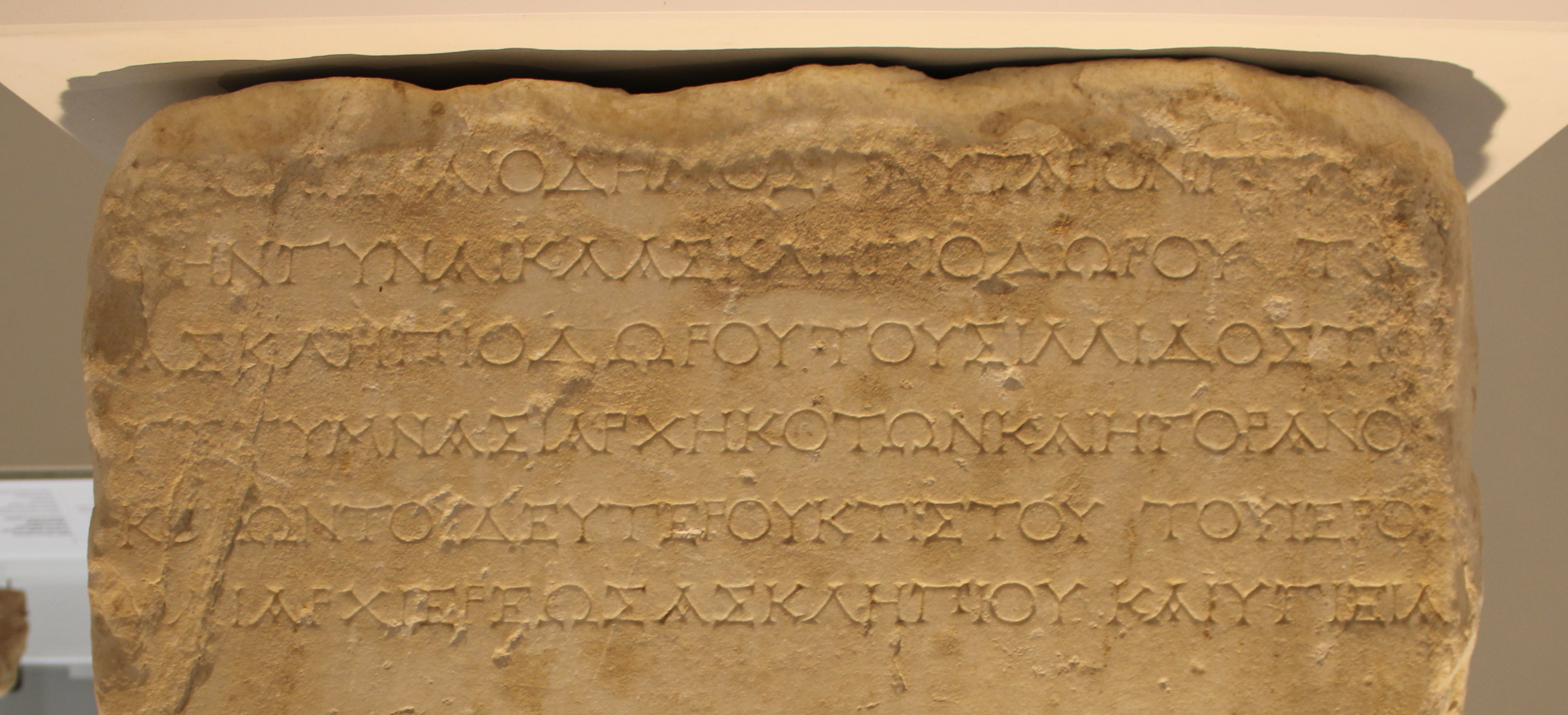
The Greek inscription

After the base was turned upside down, a Greek inscription was engraved on it, from the end of the first century BC:

[Ἡ]ΠΟΛΙΣΚΑΙΔΗΜΟΣΠΝΥΤΑΡΙΟΝΙΠΠΑΧ[ου]
[Hē] polis kai ho demos Pnytarion Hipparkh[ou]
The city and the people (consecrated) Pnytarion, daughter of Hipparch[os]
ΤΗΝΓΥΝΑΙΚΑΑΣΚΛΗΠΙΟΔΩΡΟΥ ΤΟΥ
tēn gynaika Asklēpidōrou (gap) tou
wife of Asclepidoros, son of
ΑΣΚΛΗΠΙΟΔΩΡΟΥΤΟΥΣΙΛΛΙΔΟΣΤΩΝ
Asklēpidōrou tou Sillidos tōn
Asclepidoros, himself son of Sillis, who
ΓΕΓΥΜΝΑΣΙΑΡΧΗΚΟΤΩΝΚΑΙΗΓΟΡΑΝΟΜ[η]
gegymnasiarkhēkotōn kai ēgoranom[ē-]
fulfilled the functions of gymnasiarch and agoranom[os]
ΚΟ[τ]ΩΝΤΟΥΔΕΥΤΕΡΟΥΚΤΙΣΤΟΥ ΤΟΥΙΕΡΟΥ
-ko[t]ōn, tou deuterou ktistou (gap) tou hierou
the second founder of the sanctuary
[κ]ΑΙΑΡΧΙΕΡΕΩΣΑΣΚΛΗΠΙΟΥΚΑΙΥΓΙΕΙΑ[ς]
[k]ai arkhiereōs Asklēpiou kai Hygieia[s]
[a]nd the high-priest of Asklepius and Hygieia.

The dedication is made for a woman of an "old Cypriot family" allied to Hellenized Semites. Names formed with the component Πνυτ- (from πνυτός "advised") are common in Cyprus, both in syllabic and alphabetical inscriptions, but very rare outside Cyprus. The name of the grandfather, Sillis, is Semitic, and his son and grandson's name, Asclepiodoros, is Greek and correspond with their function as priests of Asclepius, translated to Semitic as Eshmun. The members of the family who held religious power also functioned as held the function of a gymnasiarch, linked to military power, and an agoranomos, attested twice in Kition and well-known from Salamis, which perhaps took over the Phoenician function of rb srsrm (chief of commercial agents) known from KAI 34 (one of the Kition necropolis inscriptions).

== Sanctuaries for Eshmun and Asclepius? ==
The Greek inscription might indicate a preceding Phoenician temple to Eshmun in the provenance of the marble base. It can be suggested that the Phoenician inscription dedicated a statue to Eshmun in his temple in the Larnaca salt lake area (where stone vases mentioning Eshmun and dating to the 4th century BC were found); although there is no evidence for identification between Eshmun and Asclepius in the classical period, it is likely that the same area served twice as the sanctuary for a medicine god. The Greek inscription affirms that the sanctuary of Asclepius (and Hygieia) was founded by Pnytarion's husband, so it is reasonable to assume that a Phoenician sanctuary for Eshmun was destroyed or fell into disuse, and refounded as a sanctuary dedicated to Asclepius and Hygieia.
