= Papyrus Oxyrhynchus 59 =

3rd Century historical artifact

Papyrus Oxyrhynchus 59 (P. Oxy. 59) is a letter announcing the appointment of a delegate to the praefect's court in Alexandria, written in Greek. The manuscript was written on papyrus in the form of a sheet. It was discovered by Grenfell and Hunt in 1897 in Oxyrhynchus. The document was written on 11 February 292. Currently it is housed in the British Library (753). The text was published by Grenfell and Hunt in 1898.

The letter was addressed to the strategus of Oxyrhynchus. It was written by Aurelius Apollo, the president of the council of Oxyrhynchus, on the council's behalf. The measurements of the fragment are 227 by 154 mm.

== See also ==
- Oxyrhynchus Papyri
- Papyrus Oxyrhynchus 58
- Papyrus Oxyrhynchus 60
