= AD 99 =

AD 99 in various calendars
Gregorian calendar	AD 99; XCIX
Ab urbe condita	852
Assyrian calendar	4849
Balinese saka calendar	20–21
Bengali calendar	−495 – −494
Berber calendar	1049
Buddhist calendar	643
Burmese calendar	−539
Byzantine calendar	5607–5608
Chinese calendar	戊戌年 (Earth Dog); 2796 or 2589 — to — 己亥年 (Earth Pig); 2797 or 2590
Coptic calendar	−185 – −184
Discordian calendar	1265
Ethiopian calendar	91–92
Hebrew calendar	3859–3860
- Hindu calendars
Vikram Samvat	155–156
Shaka Samvat	20–21
Kali Yuga	3199–3200
Holocene calendar	10099
Iranian calendar	523 BP – 522 BP
Islamic calendar	539 BH – 538 BH
Javanese calendar	N/A
Julian calendar	AD 99; XCIX
Korean calendar	2432
Minguo calendar	1813 before ROC 民前1813年
Nanakshahi calendar	−1369
Seleucid era	410/411 AG
Thai solar calendar	641–642
Tibetan calendar	ས་ཕོ་ཁྱི་ལོ་ (male Earth-Dog); 225 or −156 or −928 — to — ས་མོ་ཕག་ལོ་ (female Earth-Boar); 226 or −155 or −927

AD 99 (XCIX) was a common year starting on Tuesday of the Julian calendar. At the time, it was known as the Year of the Consulship of Palma and Senecio (or, less frequently, year 852 Ab urbe condita). The denomination AD 99 for this year has been used since the early medieval period, when the Anno Domini calendar era became the prevalent method in Europe for naming years.

== Events ==
=== By place ===
==== Roman Empire ====
- Emperor Trajan returns to Rome.
- Emissaries of the Kushan Empire reach the Roman Empire.
- August 29 – Papyrus Oxyrhynchus 581, recording the sale of a slave girl, is written.

=== By topic ===
==== Religion ====
- November 23 – Pope Evaristus succeeds Pope Clement I as the fifth pope according to Roman Catholic tradition.

== Births ==
- c. March 9 – Narcissus of Jerusalem, Christian bishop and saint (d. c. 216)

== Deaths ==
- Approximate date – Clement of Rome, pope of the Catholic Church
