= Mary Gregory (bishop) =

Mary Emma Gregory (born 1970) is a British Anglican bishop and former prison governor. Since 2025, she has served as Bishop of Reading, an area bishop in the Church of England's Diocese of Oxford.

== Biography ==
Gregory was born in 1970. She grew up in rural Leicestershire and Lincolnshire. She studied English Literature at the University of Birmingham, graduating with a Bachelor of Arts (BA) in 1992. She worked in the prison service, rising to become a prison governor at HM Prison Wakefield and HM Prison Moorland.

From 2002 to 2005, Gregory trained for ordination at Cranmer Hall, Durham. She also studied theology at St John's College, Durham, graduating with a BA degree in 2004 and a Master of Arts (MA) degree in 2006. She was ordained in the Church of England as a deacon in 2005 and as a priest in 2006. On 27 February 2025, she was consecrated as a bishop during a service Canterbury Cathedral by Stephen Cottrell, Archbishop of York.
