= Papyrus Oxyrhynchus 39 =

Greek papyrus fragment

Papyrus Oxyrhynchus 39 (P. Oxy. 39) is a release from military service of the praefect Vergillus Capito to Tryphon, written in Greek. It was discovered by Grenfell and Hunt in 1897 in Oxyrhynchus. The document was written on 24 April 52 CE. It is housed in the Egyptian Museum (Cat. Gen. 10001) in Cairo. The text was published by Grenfell and Hunt in 1898.

The manuscript was written on papyrus in the form of a sheet. The measurements of the fragment are 297 by 185 mm.

== See also ==
- Oxyrhynchus Papyri
- Papyrus Oxyrhynchus 38
- Papyrus Oxyrhynchus 40
