= Papyrus Oxyrhynchus 42 =

Ancient Greek manuscript

Papyrus Oxyrhynchus 42 (P. Oxy. 42) is a proclamation of Dioscorides written in Greek. It was discovered by Grenfell and Hunt in 1897 in Oxyrhynchus. The document was written on 18 January 323. It is housed in the British Museum (747) in London. The text was published by Grenfell and Hunt in 1898.

The manuscript was written on papyrus in the form of a sheet. The measurements of the fragment are 277 by 202 mm. The text is written in cursive letters.

== See also ==
- Oxyrhynchus Papyri
- Papyrus Oxyrhynchus 41
- Papyrus Oxyrhynchus 43
