= Papyrus Oxyrhynchus 41 =

Greek papyrus fragment

Papyrus Oxyrhynchus 41 (P. Oxy. 41) is a report of a public meeting by an unknown author, written in Greek. It was discovered by Grenfell and Hunt in 1897 in Oxyrhynchus. The document is dated to the early fourth century. It is housed in the Egyptian Museum (Cat. Gen. 10073) in Cairo. The text was published by Grenfell and Hunt in 1898.

The manuscript was written on papyrus in the form of a sheet. The measurements of the fragment are 313 by 263 mm. The fragment includes a number of strange words and expressions.

== See also ==
- Oxyrhynchus Papyri
- Papyrus Oxyrhynchus 40
- Papyrus Oxyrhynchus 42
