= Papyrus Oxyrhynchus 55 =

Ancient document

Papyrus Oxyrhynchus 55 (P. Oxy. 55) is a request for payment for the construction of a street, written in Greek. The manuscript was written on papyrus in the form of a sheet. It was discovered by Grenfell and Hunt in 1897 in Oxyrhynchus. The document was written on 7 April 283. It is housed in the Cambridge University Library (MSS Add.4033-4035). The text was published by Grenfell and Hunt in 1898.

The letter is addressed to Aurelius Apollonius. It was written by two joiners, Aurelius Menestheus and Aurelius Nemesianus. The measurements of the fragment are 230 by 158 mm.

== See also ==
- Oxyrhynchus Papyri
- Papyrus Oxyrhynchus 54
- Papyrus Oxyrhynchus 56
