= Papyrus Oxyrhynchus 52 =

Ancient Greek manuscript

Papyrus Oxyrhynchus 52 (P. Oxy. 52) is a report from two public physicians, written in Greek. The manuscript was written on papyrus in the form of a sheet. It was discovered by Grenfell and Hunt in 1897 in Oxyrhynchus. The document was written between 25 July and 23 August of the year 325. It is housed in the Glasgow University Library (Special Collections Department). The text was published by Grenfell and Hunt in 1898.

The papyrus was addressed to Flavius Leucadius, the logistes of the Oxyrhynchite nome. It describes the visit of physicians Didymus and Sylvanus to the daughter of Aurelius Dioscorus, who had been injured in the collapse of a house. The measurements of the fragment are 147 by 100 mm.

== See also ==
- Oxyrhynchus Papyri
- Papyrus Oxyrhynchus 51
- Papyrus Oxyrhynchus 53
