= Papyrus Oxyrhynchus 44 =

Greek manuscript

Papyrus Oxyrhynchus 44 (P. Oxy. 44) is a "sale of taxes," from Paniscus to Asclepiades, written in Greek. It was discovered by Grenfell and Hunt in 1897 in Oxyrhynchus. The document was written between the years 66 and 70, although Grenfell and Hunt dated it to the end of the first century. It is housed in the British Museum (749) in London. The text was published by Grenfell and Hunt in 1898.

The manuscript was written on papyrus in the form of a sheet. The measurements of the fragment are 173 by 144 mm. The text is written in a fine semi-cursive hand.

== See also ==
- Oxyrhynchus Papyri
- Papyrus Oxyrhynchus 43
- Papyrus Oxyrhynchus 45
