= Papyrus Oxyrhynchus 43 =

Greek manuscript

Papyrus Oxyrhynchus 43 (P. Oxy. 43) is a fragment with the texts of two documents by unknown authors, written in Greek. It was discovered by Grenfell and Hunt in 1897 in Oxyrhynchus. It is housed in the British Museum (748) in London. The text was published by Grenfell and Hunt in 1898.

On the recto the fragment contains military accounts. The text on the recto was written on 16 February 295. The document on the verso was written not long afterwards and contains a list of guards or watchmen of Oxyrhynchus. It gives an idea of the size of Oxyrhynchus in the fourth century.

The manuscript was written on papyrus in the form of a roll. The measurements of the fragment are 250 by 900 mm. The text is written in cursive letters.

== See also ==
- Oxyrhynchus Papyri
- Papyrus Oxyrhynchus 42
- Papyrus Oxyrhynchus 44
