= Papyrus Oxyrhynchus 54 =

Greek manuscript

Papyrus Oxyrhynchus 54 (P. Oxy. 54) is a letter concerning the repair of public buildings, written in Greek. The manuscript was written on papyrus in the form of a sheet. It was discovered by Grenfell and Hunt in 1897 in Oxyrhynchus. The document was written between 27 March and 25 April of the year 201. It is housed in the Institute for the Study of Ancient Cultures in the University of Chicago. The text was published by Grenfell and Hunt in 1898.

The letter was addressed to two municipal officials of Oxyrhynchus. It was written by two builders, Diogenes and Lucius, who had undertaken to repair the baths of Hadrian, asking for a payment of three talents of silver. The measurements of the fragment are 300 by 90 mm.

== See also ==
- Oxyrhynchus Papyri
- Papyrus Oxyrhynchus 53
- Papyrus Oxyrhynchus 55
