= Papyrus Oxyrhynchus 46 =

Greek Text

Papyrus Oxyrhynchus 46 (P. Oxy. 46) is about a land distribution (καταλοχισμός), written by Phanias and Diogenes in Greek. It was discovered by Grenfell and Hunt in 1897 in Oxyrhynchus. The document was written on 30 January 100. It is housed in the Houghton Library (SM Inv. 2212) of Harvard University. The text was published by Grenfell and Hunt in 1898.

The manuscript was written on papyrus in the form of a sheet. The measurements of the fragment are 253 by 78 mm. It is written in the same formula as Papyrus Oxyrhynchus 45.

== See also ==
- Oxyrhynchus Papyri
- Papyrus Oxyrhynchus 45
- Papyrus Oxyrhynchus 47
