= Papyrus Oxyrhynchus 53 =

Egyptian manuscript

Papyrus Oxyrhynchus 53 (P. Oxy. 53) is a report on a persea tree, written in Greek. The manuscript was written on papyrus in the form of a sheet. It was discovered by Grenfell and Hunt in 1897 in Oxyrhynchus. The document was written on 25 February 316. It is housed in the British Library (P.Lond. III 751). The text was published by Grenfell and Hunt in 1898.

The papyrus was written by Aurelius Irenaeus to Valerius Ammonianus on behalf of the guild of carpenters. The measurements of the fragment are 248 by 155 mm.

Pliny described the Egyptian persea tree in his Naturalis Historia XIII, 9,15.

== See also ==
- Oxyrhynchus Papyri
- Papyrus Oxyrhynchus 52
- Papyrus Oxyrhynchus 54
