= Papyrus Oxyrhynchus 50 =

Egyptian manuscript

Papyrus Oxyrhynchus 50 (P. Oxy. 50) is a receipt concerning the emancipation of a slave of a banker, written in Greek. The manuscript was written on papyrus in the form of a sheet. It was discovered by Grenfell and Hunt in 1897 in Oxyrhynchus. The document was written before the year 99. It is housed in the library of Trinity College (Pap. RF 1) in Dublin. The text was published by Grenfell and Hunt in 1898.

The measurements of the fragment are 65 by 91 mm. It is a receipt from the bank of Theon, sent to the agoranomus of Oxyrhynchus, requesting the freedom of a slave, for whom 10 drachmae of silver and 2 talents, 6,000 drachmae of copper had been paid. The papyrus was written by the same hand as Papyrus Oxyrhynchus 49 and probably refers to the same transaction. It was written either three months earlier or ninth months later than P. Oxy. 49.

== See also ==
- Oxyrhynchus Papyri
- Papyrus Oxyrhynchus 49
- Papyrus Oxyrhynchus 51
