= Papyrus Oxyrhynchus 56 =

Letter written in Greek

Papyrus Oxyrhynchus 56 (P. Oxy. 56) is a letter requesting the appointment of a guardian, written in Greek. The manuscript was written on papyrus in the form of a sheet. It was discovered by Grenfell and Hunt in 1897 in Oxyrhynchus. The document was written on 28 October 203. It is housed in the Cambridge University Library (MS Add.4036). The text was published by Grenfell and Hunt in 1898.

The letter was addressed to Maximus, a holder of various municipal offices. It was written by Tabesammon, daughter of Ammonius. She states that she has arranged for a loan with her vineyard as security, and asks Maximus to act as her guardian in the absence of the Basilikos Grammateus (royal secretary). The measurements of the fragment are 238 by 95 mm.

== See also ==
- Oxyrhynchus Papyri
- Papyrus Oxyrhynchus 55
- Papyrus Oxyrhynchus 57
