= Papyrus Oxyrhynchus 58 =

3rd Century historical artifact

Papyrus Oxyrhynchus 58 (P. Oxy. 58) is a letter concerning the appointment of treasury officials, written in Greek. The manuscript was written on papyrus in the form of a sheet. It was discovered by Grenfell and Hunt in 1897 in Oxyrhynchus. The document was written on 13 September 288. It is housed in the British Library (752). The text was published by Grenfell and Hunt in 1898.

The letter was addressed to the strategi of the Heptanomis and the Arsinoite nomes. It was written by Servaeus Africanus, probably the epistrategus of the division containing the nomes. Servaeus complains that the number of officials is too costly. He orders that in the future, each estate will be administered by one official, assisted by at most three subordinates. The measurements of the fragment are 220 by 125 mm.

== See also ==
- Oxyrhynchus Papyri
- Papyrus Oxyrhynchus 57
- Papyrus Oxyrhynchus 59
