= Papyrus Oxyrhynchus 51 =

Greek manuscript

Papyrus Oxyrhynchus 51 (P. Oxy. 51) is a report by a public physician, written in Greek. The manuscript was written on papyrus in the form of a sheet. It was discovered by Grenfell and Hunt in 1897 in Oxyrhynchus. The document was written on 31 August 173. It is housed in the Edinburgh University Library. The text was published by Grenfell and Hunt in 1898.

The report was addressed to Claudianus, the strategus of the nome. It describes the cause of death of a man named Hierax, who had been found hanged by a noose. The measurements of the fragment are 14 by 72 mm. The text was written in a very cursive sloping hand.

== See also ==
- Oxyrhynchus Papyri
- Papyrus Oxyrhynchus 50
- Papyrus Oxyrhynchus 52
