= Bishop of Reading =

Suffragan bishop in the Church of England

The Bishop of Reading is an episcopal title used by a suffragan bishop of the Church of England Diocese of Oxford, which is within the Province of Canterbury, England. On 27 November 2024, it was announced that the next Bishop of Reading would be Mary Gregory, succeeding Olivia Graham. Gregory was consecrated as Bishop of Reading on 27 February 2025.

The title takes its name after the town of Reading in Berkshire. The bishops suffragan of Reading have been area bishops since the Oxford area scheme was founded in 1984. The Bishop of Reading is responsible for the archdeaconry of Berkshire.

== List of bishops ==
Bishops of Reading
From	Until	Incumbent	Notes
1889	1909	Leslie Randall	
1909	1942	in abeyance	
1942	1954	Arthur Parham	
1954	1972	Eric Knell	
1972	1982	Eric Wild	
1982	1989	Graham Foley	First area bishop from 1984.
1989	1997	John Bone	
1997	2003	Dominic Walker	Also known as Edward William Murray Walker. Translated to Monmouth.
2003		Jeffrey John	Nominated in May 2003, but withdrew in July 2003 after controversy about his homosexuality.
2004	2010	Stephen Cottrell	Translated to Chelmsford.
2011	2019	Andrew Proud	Retired 1 May 2019.
2019	2024	Olivia Graham	Consecrated 19 November 2019; retired 30 September 2024.
2025	present	Mary Gregory	Announced 27 November 2024; consecrated 27 February 2025.
