= Papyrus Oxyrhynchus 45 =

Egyptian manuscript

Papyrus Oxyrhynchus 45 (P. Oxy. 45) is about a land distribution (καταλοχισμός), from Phanias and two other inspectors. It is written in Greek. It was discovered by Grenfell and Hunt in 1897 in Oxyrhynchus. The document was written on 29 August 95. It is housed in the University of Pennsylvania (University Museum, E 2750) in Philadelphia, Pennsylvania. The manuscript was written on papyrus in the form of a sheet. The text was published by Grenfell and Hunt in 1898.

== See also ==
- Oxyrhynchus Papyri
- Papyrus Oxyrhynchus 44
- Papyrus Oxyrhynchus 46
