= Edgar Britten =

English Merchant Navy captain (1874-1936)

- Britten in 1935
- Born: Edgar Theophilus Britten; 1874; Bradford, England
- Died: 28 October 1936 (aged 61–62); Southampton, England
- Occupation: Cunard captain
- Years active: 1880s–1936

Sir Edgar Britten KB RD RNR (1874 – October 28, 1936) was a Cunard Line captain remembered primarily for being the first captain of the ocean liner RMS Queen Mary in 1936.

Born in Bradford, England, he began his career as a cabin boy. He had started with Cunard in 1901 and over the years rose in rank and eventually commanded well-known company vessels such as Laconia, Mauretania, Aquitania and RMS Berengaria. In New York on the Queen Mary's maiden voyage, Britten was interviewed by the newsreels and for posterity he was recorded on sound film giving his opinion on the details of the ship.

== Death ==
In October 1936, Britten died in hospital in Southampton after being found unconscious in his cabin onboard the RMS Queen Mary several hours prior to the ship's departure to New York. He was later buried at sea.
