= Jon Bounds =

English writer

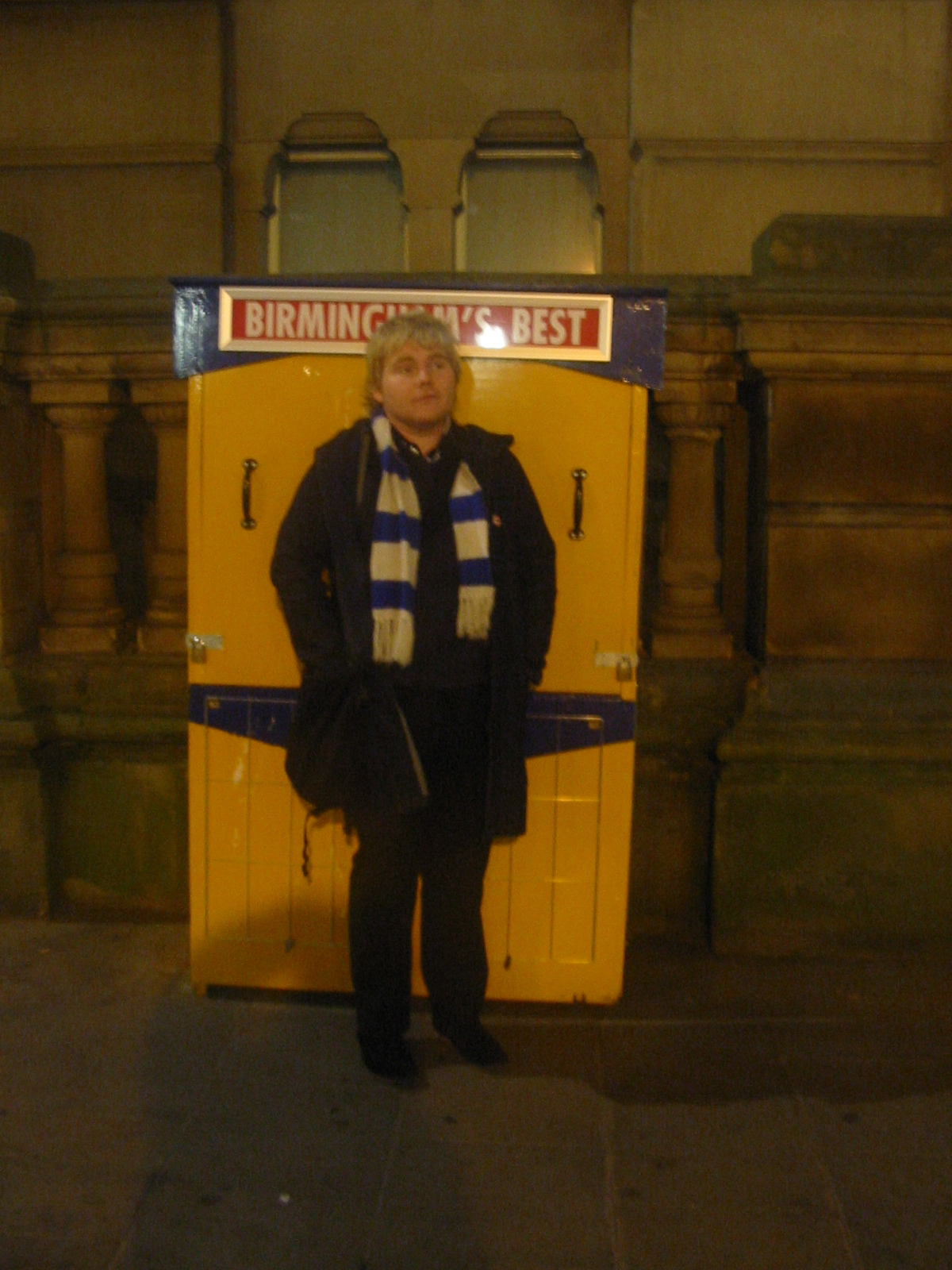
- Bounds outside Birmingham Town Hall in December 2001
- Born: 30 June 1975 (age 50)
- Other names: Bounder
- Education: King Edward VI Grammar School, Aston
- Alma mater: University of Birmingham
- Occupations: blogger, freelance social media and multimedia consultant
- Known for: B:iNS, TwitPanto
- Spouse: Libby Hayward
- Awards: "14th Most Influential" in the Birmingham Post Power 50; Official Honouree, Webby Awards
- Jon Bounds' voice recorded October 2012
- Website: www.jonbounds.co.uk

Jon Bounds (born 30 June 1975), is a writer and blogger originally from Birmingham, England, resident in Oxford since the early 2010s.

Raised in the city's Perry Barr district, he attended King Edward VI Grammar School, Aston.

After working as a technical and commissioning editor for friends of ED, he spent nearly four years working for the BBC as technical co-ordinator of the Public Space at BBC Birmingham, and studied Computer Science at the University of Birmingham. He was Online Editor for the Big Picture project.

Bounds is known for creating a blog called "Birmingham: It's Not Shit" in response to the 2002 bid for Birmingham to become a European City of Culture. In 2012, he told the BBC that the site attracted 10,000 visitors per month. He was listed as the "14th Most Influential Person in the West Midlands" in the Birmingham Post's "Power 50" in 2008. and was considered for inclusion again in 2009.

On 11 November 2008 (starting at 11 am), Bounds spent eleven hours on Birmingham's number 11 bus route, the outer circle, documenting his journey online, using Twitter, Facebook and a blog, elevenbus.co.uk. The next month, he organised TwitPanto, a pantomime on Twitter, which featured a cast that included Government Minister Tom Watson MP and Guardian writer Jemima Kiss. A further TwitPanto, on 18 December 2009, in which Watson – by then a back-bench MP – again had a part, was hosted by Birmingham Hippodrome and named as an Official Honouree by the Webby Awards. The event ran again on 20 December 2010.

Bounds has written for a number of media outlets, including the Birmingham Post, the BBC website, and The Guardian website. With Julia Gilbert, he presented a Saturday-morning radio show on Rhubarb Radio.

In 2011 along with Danny Smith, he undertook a trip around all 56 of the surviving pleasure piers in England and Wales. Their book, Pier Review, was published by Summersdale in February 2016.

In the meanwhile, in 2014, Bounds co-authored a book with Birmingham City University lecturers Jon Hickman and Craig Hamilton. Titled 101 Things Birmingham Gave the World, it was published by Paradise Circus.

He now resides in Oxford, where he is standing for election to Oxfordshire County Council as a Labour Party candidate for Abingdon North, in the 2017 local elections.

== Bibliography ==
- Bounds, Jon; Cooke, Liz; Hickman, Jon; et al. (2014). 101 Things Birmingham Gave the World. Paradise Circus. ISBN 9781782803997.
- Bounds, Jon; Smith, Danny (2016). Pier Review: A Road Trip in Search of the Great British Seaside. Summersdale. ISBN 9781849538114.
