= Ruth Freitag =

American librarian and bibliographer (1924–2020)

Ruth Steinmuller Freitag
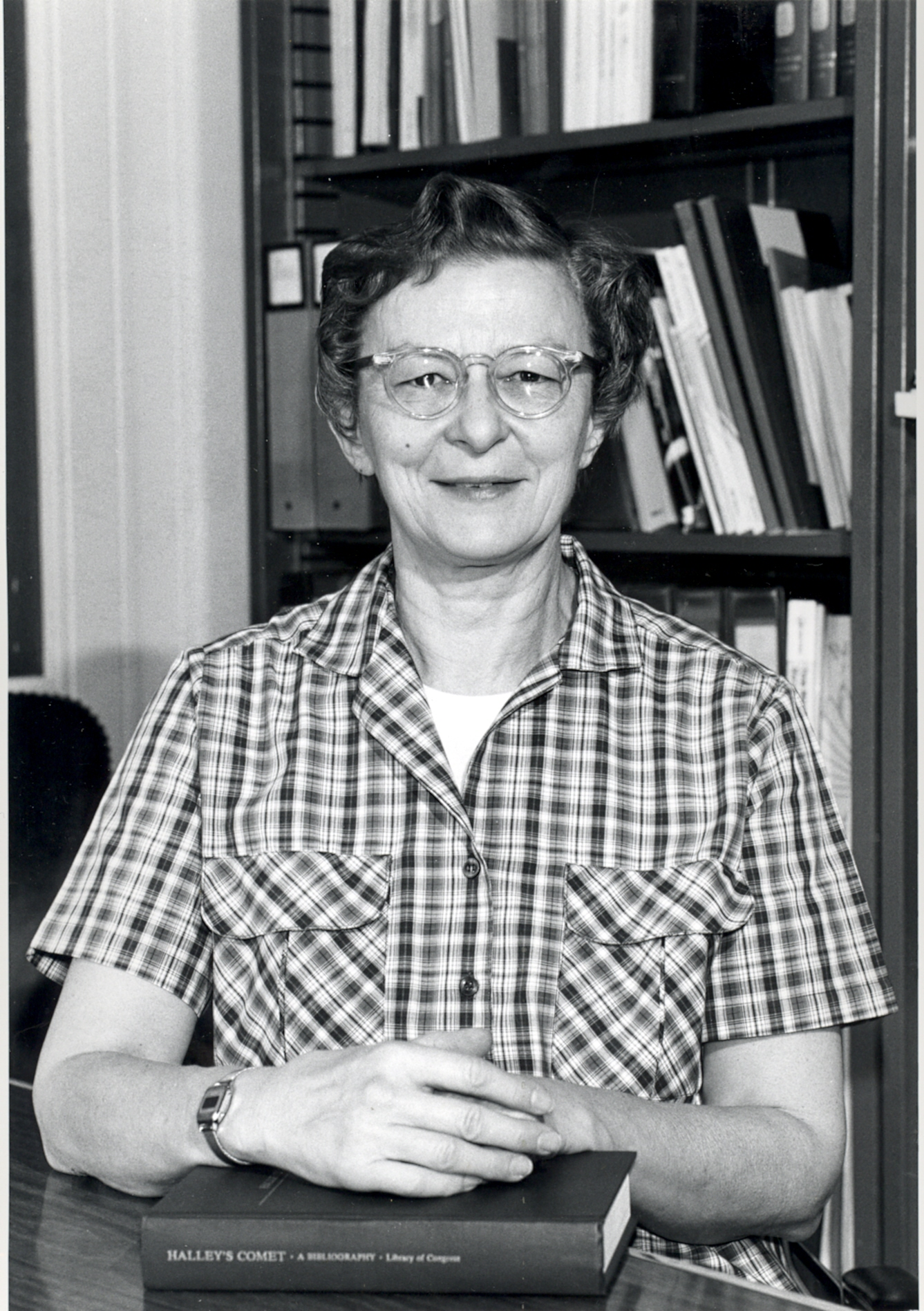
- Born: 8 June 1924; Lancaster, Pennsylvania, U.S.
- Died: 3 October 2020 (aged 96); Falls Church, Virginia, U.S.
- Education: Pennsylvania State University (BA); University of Southern California (MLS)
- Occupations: Reference librarian, bibliographer
- Employer: Library of Congress
- Known for: Bibliographies in astronomy; development of MARC standards

Ruth Steinmuller Freitag (8 June 1924 – 3 October 2020) was an American reference librarian at the Library of Congress with an expertise in astronomy. Freitag was known for compiling extensive bibliographies.

== Biography ==
Born in Lancaster, Pennsylvania, Freitag studied history at Pennsylvania State University, graduating with a liberal arts degree in 1944. She served with the Women's Army Corps in China from 1945. After three years she was accepted to the United States Foreign Service, working as a communication specialist at the US embassies in the UK and Hong Kong. She earned a master's degree in library science at the University of Southern California in 1959 and that year took a post at the Library of Congress. In the 1960s Freitag was instrumental in developing the MARC (machine-readable cataloging) standards, which helped standardize digital records shared between libraries.

During her time at the Library of Congress, Freitag was a reference librarian specializing in the compilation of bibliographic guides, particularly on topics related to astronomy. One of her noted achievements was compiling, illustrating and annotating an extensive bibliography on Halley's Comet, which was published by the Library of Congress in 1984. Her patrons included Isaac Asimov and Carl Sagan. She retired from the library in 2006 and died on 3 October 2020 at a nursing home in Falls Church, Virginia.
