= Norman Russell =

British clergyman

Venerable Norman Russell
- Born: Norman Atkinson Russell; 7 August 1943 (age 83)
- Education: Royal Belfast Academical Institution, Churchill College, Cambridge
- Occupation: Retired Archdeacon of the Diocese of Berkshire

Norman Atkinson Russell (7 August 1943 - 30 September 2026) was a British clergyman who was the Archdeacon of Berkshire from 1998 until Easter 2013. His retirement service was Sunday 12 May 2013

== Biography ==
Russell was born in 1942 and educated at the Royal Belfast Academical Institution and Churchill College, Cambridge. After an earlier career as an accountant he was ordained in 1971. He began his ministry with curacies at Christ Church with Emmanuel, Clifton, Bristol and Christ Church, Cockfosters. He was Rector of Harwell with Chilton, Oxfordshire from 1977 to 1984 and then Priest in charge at St James', Gerrards Cross. Later he was Rural Dean of Amersham and after his appointment as Archdeacon Prolocutor of the Lower house of the Convocation of Canterbury.

He was also a honorary research fellow at St Stephen's House, Oxford.

Russell died in 2026, aged 83.

Church of England titles
Preceded by Michael Arthur Hill	Archdeacon of Berkshire; 1998 – 2013	Succeeded by Olivia Graham
