= Decade =

Period of 10 years

A decade (from Ancient Greek: δεκάς, dekas, lit. 'group of 10') is a period of ten years. It may also be called a decennium (from Latin: decennium, lit. 'ten-year'). Decades may describe any ten-year period, such as those of a person's life, or refer to specific groupings of calendar years.

== Usage ==
Any period of ten years is a 'decade' or 'decennium'. For example, the statement that "during his last decade, Mozart explored chromatic harmony to a degree rare at the time" refers to the last 10 years of Wolfgang Amadeus Mozart's life without regard to which calendar years are encompassed. Also, 'the first decade' of a person's life begins on the day of their birth and ends at the end of their 10th year of life when they have their 10th birthday; the second decade of life starts with their 11th year of life (during which one is typically still referred to as being "10") and ends at the end of their 20th year of life, on their 20th birthday; similarly, the third decade of life, when one is in one's twenties or 20s, starts with the 21st year of life, and so on, with subsequent decades of life similarly described by referencing the tens digit of one's age.

=== 0-to-9 decade ===
The most widely used method for denominating decades is to group years based on their shared tens digit, from a year ending in a 0 to a year ending in a 9 – for example, the period from 1960 to 1969 is the 1960s, and the period from 1970 to 1979 is the 1970s. However, this method of grouping decades cannot be applied to the decade immediately preceding AD 10, because there was no year zero in the Anno Domini (AD) calendar year system. Sometimes, only the tens part is mentioned ('60s or sixties, and '70s or seventies), although this may leave it ambiguous as to which century is meant.

Referring to ten-year periods as decades in this way only became common in the late 19th century. Particularly in the 20th century, 0-to-9 decades came to be referred to with associated nicknames, such as the "Roaring Twenties" (1920s), the "Warring Forties" (1940s), and the "Swinging Sixties" (1960s). This practice is occasionally also applied to decades of earlier centuries; for example, referencing the 1890s as the "Gay Nineties" or "Naughty Nineties".

=== 1-to-0 decade ===
A rarer approach groups years from the beginning of the AD calendar era to produce successive decades from a year ending in a 1 to a year ending in a 0, with the years 1–10 described as "the 1st decade", years 11–20 "the 2nd decade", and so on; later decades are more usually described as 'the st, nd, rd, or th decade of the st, nd, rd, or th century' (using the strict interpretation of 'century'). (Note: There are two ways of thinking about when a century begins and ends. The "strict" viewpoint counts centuries from −01 to −00, while the "popular" viewpoint counts centuries from −00 to −99. For example, the "first decade of the 19th century" may mean either 1801–1810 (if used in "strict" terms) or 1800–1809 (if used in "popular" terms). See century for more information.) For example, "the second decad of the 12th. Cent." [sic]; "The last decade of that century"; "1st decade of the 16th century"; "third decade of the 16th century"; "the first decade of the 18th century". This decade grouping may also be identified explicitly; for example, "1961–1970"; "2001–2010"; "2021–2030". The BC calendar era ended with the year 1 BC and the AD calendar era began the following year, AD 1. There was no year 0.

Usage methods compared
Year	1	2	3	...	9	10	11	12	...	19	20	...	2000	2001	2002	...	2009	2010	2011	2012	...	2019	2020	2021	2022	...	2029	2030
0-to-9 decade	0s					10s					...		2000s					2010s					2020s					...
1-to-0 decade	1st decade of the 1st century						2nd decade of the 1st century					...		1st decade of the 21st century					2nd decade of the 21st century					3rd decade of the 21st century				

=== Public usage of the two methods ===
A YouGov poll was conducted on December 2, 2019, asking 13,582 adults in the United States, "When do you think the next decade will begin and end?" Results showed that 64% answered that "the next decade" would begin on January 1, 2020, and end on December 31, 2029 (0-to-9 method); 17% answered that "the next decade" would begin on January 1, 2021, and end on December 31, 2030 (1-to-0 method); 19% replied that they did not know.

== See also ==
- List of decades, centuries, and millennia
- Century
- Millennium
- Year
