= Stephen Cottrell =

Archbishop of York since 2020

The Most Reverend and Right Honourable Stephen Cottrell SCP
- Archbishop of York; Primate of England
- Cottrell in 2026
- Church: Church of England
- Diocese: York
- In office: 2020–present
- Predecessor: John Sentamu
- Other posts: Bishop of Reading (area bishop) (2004–2010); Bishop of Chelmsford (2010–2020)

Orders
- Ordination: 1 July 1984 (deacon); 30 June 1985 (priest) by Ronald Bowlby
- Consecration: 4 May 2004 by Rowan Williams

Personal details
- Born: 31 August 1958 (age 68) Leigh-on-Sea, Essex, England
- Denomination: Anglican
- Residence: Bishopthorpe Palace, York
- Spouse: Rebecca
- Children: 3
- Education: Polytechnic of Central London; St Stephen's House, Oxford

Member of the House of Lords
- Lord Spiritual
- Ex officio as Archbishop of York; 22 October 2020
- Bishop of Chelmsford; 25 March 2014 – 22 October 2020

Stephen Geoffrey Cottrell PC SCP (/ˈkɒtrəl/; born 31 August 1958) is a Church of England bishop. Since 9 July 2020, he has been the Archbishop of York and Primate of England; the second-most senior bishop of the church and the most senior in northern England. He previously served as Bishop of Reading (an area bishop in the Diocese of Oxford), 2004–2010, and as Bishop of Chelmsford, 2010–2020.

From 7 January 2025 until 28 January 2026, Cottrell assumed most of the primatial functions of the Archbishop of Canterbury during the vacancy that followed the resignation of archbishop Justin Welby.

== Early life and education ==
Cottrell was born on 31 August 1958 in Leigh-on-Sea, Essex. His brother, David Cottrell, is a psychiatrist and academic. He was educated at Belfairs High School for Boys, a secondary modern school, and then at the sixth form of Belfairs High School for Girls. He studied at the Polytechnic of Central London, graduating with a Bachelor of Arts (BA) degree in media studies in 1979. From 1981 to 1984, he trained for ordination at St Stephen's House, Oxford. He later studied Christian leadership at St Mellitus College in London, graduating with a Master of Arts (MA) degree in 2019.

== Ordained ministry ==
Cottrell was made a deacon at Petertide on 1 July 1984 and ordained a priest the next Petertide (30 June 1985), both times by Ronald Bowlby, Bishop of Southwark, at Southwark Cathedral. His ordained ministry began as a curate at Christ Church, Forest Hill in the Diocese of Southwark. From 1988 to 1993, he was priest in charge of St Wilfrid's Church, Chichester, and also assistant director of pastoral studies at Chichester Theological College. He was then diocesan missioner for the Diocese of Wakefield and finally, before his ordination to the episcopate, canon pastor at Peterborough Cathedral.

=== Episcopal ministry ===
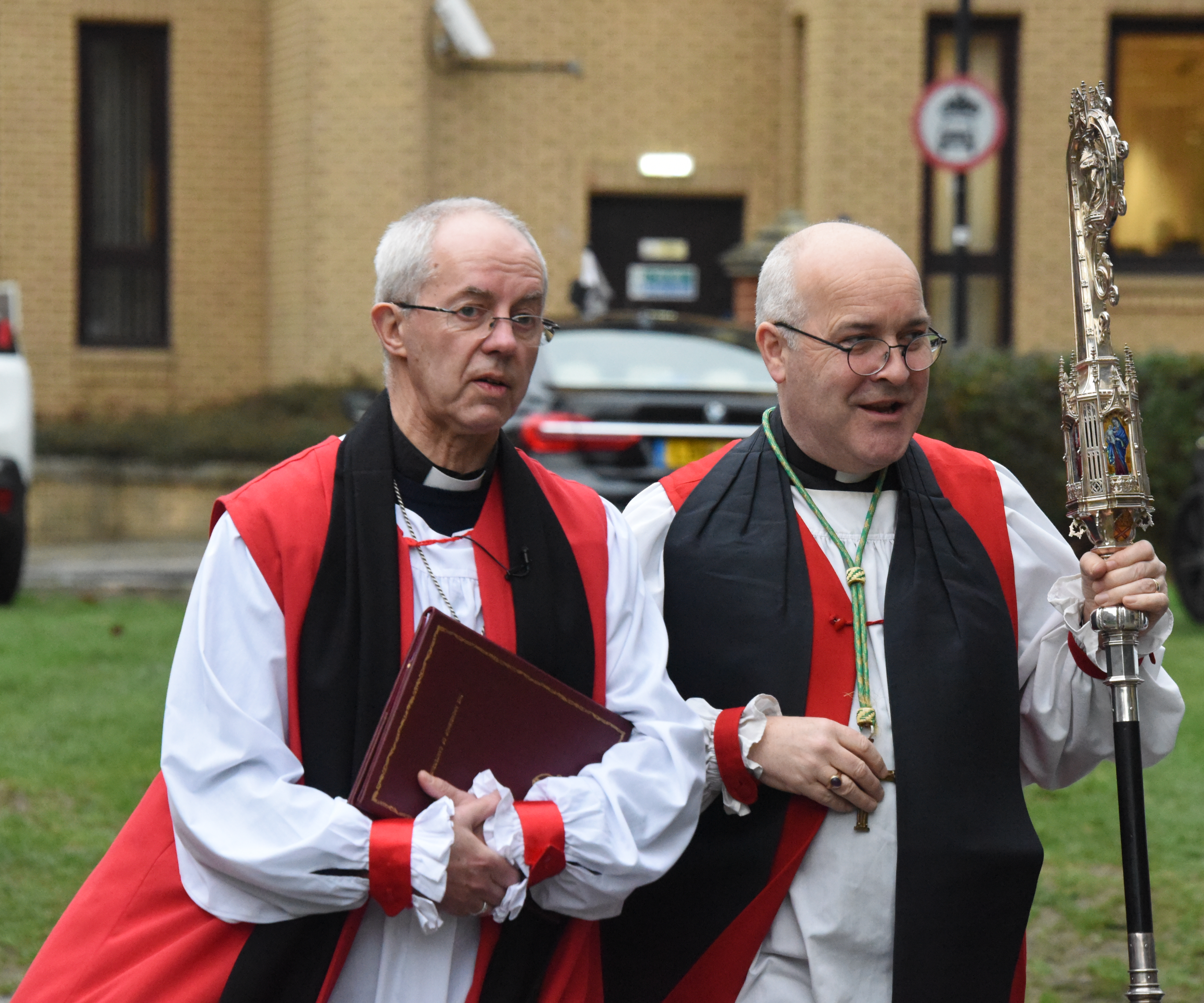
Cottrell (right, holding crozier) with Justin Welby, Archbishop of Canterbury, in 2019

Cottrell was nominated area Bishop of Reading on 6 January 2004, after Jeffrey John controversially withdrew his nomination to the post in 2003. He had been a supporter of John's original appointment. He said of his nomination: "I am looking forward to becoming the next Bishop of Reading with a mixture of excitement and trepidation. I believe my work in mission and evangelism has prepared me well for the challenges facing the church in this new century. I hope and pray that my love for and understanding of the different traditions of the Church of England will enable me to be a focus for unity in the Reading Episcopal area." He was consecrated on 4 May 2004 by Rowan Williams, Archbishop of Canterbury, at St Paul's Cathedral, following confirmation of the appointment by letters patent.

Following his nomination as bishop of Chelmsford on 22 March 2010, he was translated to the see of Chelmsford on 6 October 2010. He was installed at Chelmsford Cathedral on 27 November 2010. In 2014, he became a Lord Spiritual, one of the 26 senior diocesan bishops entitled to sit in the House of Lords; he was introduced on 25 March 2014.

On 17 December 2019, it was announced that Cottrell would succeed John Sentamu as Archbishop of York, Metropolitan of York and Primate of England, following the latter's retirement in June 2020. The position is the second-most senior clerical position in the Church of England after that of the Archbishop of Canterbury, Primate of All England. Cottrell's canonical election was held by video conference on 11 June 2020. The confirmation of his election, by which he legally took office, was held on 9 July, and his enthronement took place at York Minster during a service of Evensong on 18 October. As a matter of course, Cottrell was appointed a Privy Counsellor on 21 July 2020. Now a Lord Spiritual ex officio, he was re-introduced on 22 October 2020. In May 2023, he took part in the 2023 Coronation as one of the faith leaders offering prayers for the newly-crowned King Charles III.

=== Allegations of enabling abuse ===
In December 2024, BBC Radio 4's File on Four programme conducted an investigation into abuse perpetrated by Anglican priest David Tudor. Cottrell faced calls to resign over his handling of the safeguarding case during his tenure as Bishop of Chelmsford. In response to the programme, Cottrell issued a public statement.

As Bishop of Chelmsford, Cottrell was aware of longstanding safeguarding concerns about Tudor, including a 1989 Church ban for sexual misconduct and a 2008 safeguarding agreement preventing him from being alone with children. Despite this, Tudor was allowed to remain in his position and was made an honorary canon of Chelmsford Cathedral, a decision Cottrell's office regretted in 2024.

The BBC investigation revealed that Cottrell was informed in 2012 about a £10,000 compensation payment made by Tudor to a victim known as "Jessica," who alleged she was sexually abused by Tudor from the age of 11 during the 1970s, sometimes violently. Cottrell's office claimed that the payment admitted no liability and that he was guided by legal advice to take no further action.

Stephen Cottrell suspended Tudor from ministry in 2019, following new complaints against him. The matter was later handled by the ecclesiastical courts of the Church of England, which in October 2024 banned Tudor from ministry for life, after Tudor admitted historical sex abuse related to two girls. At least seven women came forward alleging they were abused by Tudor, with one receiving a six-figure compensation payment from the Church in 2019. The Bishop of Newcastle, Helen-Ann Hartley, called for Cottrell's resignation, as his handling of the case undermined his credibility to lead the Church. The victim known as Jessica also considers that Cottrell should leave the Church due to his failure to act on the abuse allegations.

Tudor worked for the Church of England for over 46 years across various regions. Cottrell's spokesman defended the archbishop's actions, stating he was in an "invidious situation" and lacked the legal power to dismiss Tudor. However, Tudor was twice reappointed to a senior role under Cottrell after Cottrell was aware of Tudor's misdeeds, and Cottrell is on the record as strongly praising Tudor as late as 2018.

In February 2024 a victim of Tudor filed formal complaints of misconduct under the Church's disciplinary system against Cottrell, David Tudor and bishop Wilfred Wood (a character witness for Tudor). The Church initiated a tribunal hearing into the complaint against David Tudor, which was ongoing as of January 2025.

In October 2024 Tudor was banned for life from ministry by the Church after admitting sexual misconduct.

=== Views ===
He is a member of the Society of Catholic Priests (SCP), and a member of Affirming Catholicism. In December 2014, he was selected as president of the movement, taking up the appointment at the start of 2015.

In 2007, Cottrell publicly opposed the renewal of Britain's Trident missile systems. The same year, his support for church celebrations of same-sex relationships was widely reported. In 2017, while serving as Bishop of Chelmsford, Cottrell said "Whether you believe there should be same sex marriage or the blessing of same sex unions or whether you do not, you are still a faithful Anglican...We need to find ways of living with this diversity, not being torn apart by it." He also stated that "there is no reason why prayers of thanksgiving for these [same-sex] relationships – perhaps a Eucharist – cannot be offered."

In August 2021, Cottrell suggested, in an article for the Daily Telegraph, that Welsh and Scottish sports teams could sing "God Save the Queen" along with the English team in all-British matches, saying that it would help to support the union. His idea met with angry responses by some social media users in Wales and Scotland.

At the General Synod 2023, in his Presidential Address on 7 July, Cottrell acknowledged that some individuals feel distress when addressing God as 'Father', for a variety of reasons. His remarks have attracted both support and criticism.

In November 2025, Cottrell delivered a detailed assessment of the situation in Israel and Palestine following a four-day visit to the region. In a speech on November 18 and subsequent interviews, he strongly condemned certain Israeli government policies, expressed support for Palestinian communities, and emphasized the need to distinguish criticism of the state of Israel from any form of antisemitism. He argued that a true and lasting peace is impossible without justice for all people in the region. His described Israel's actions in Gaza as "genocidal acts" and that the systemic discrimination against Palestinians in the occupied West Bank meets the definitions of "apartheid" and "ethnic cleansing".

== Personal life ==
Cottrell and his wife Rebecca have three children. He is a patron of the charity Antibiotic Research UK. The archbishops of Canterbury and York are presidents of the National Churches Trust.

== Styles ==
- 1984–2001: The Reverend Stephen Cottrell
- 2001–2004: The Reverend Canon Stephen Cottrell
- 2004–2020: The Right Reverend Stephen Cottrell SCP
  - official: The Right Reverend The Bishop of Reading/of Chelmsford
- 2020: His Grace The Most Reverend Stephen Cottrell SCP
- Since 2020:
  - personal: His Grace The Most Reverend and Right Honourable Stephen Cottrell SCP
  - official: His Grace The Most Reverend and Right Honourable The Lord Archbishop of York and Primate of England

== Selected works ==
Cottrell has written several books on the subject of evangelism and many other published titles.

- The Lord's Prayer: A Beginner's Guide, Young Explorers (Hodder Faith, 2025) ISBN 9781399819428
- P is for Pilgrim (Hodder Faith, 2024) ISBN 9781399805278
- On Priesthood: Servants, Shepherds, Messengers, Sentinels and Stewards (Hodder Faith, 2022) ISBN 9781529360981
- Dear England: Finding Hope, Taking Heart and Changing the World (Hachette Book Group, March 2021); ISBN 9781529360950
- Walking the Way of the Cross: Prayers and Reflections on the Biblical Stations of the Cross (Church House Publishing, 2019) ISBN 9780715123447
- Hit the Ground Kneeling: Seeing Leadership Differently (Church House Publishing, November 2008); ISBN 0-7151-4162-7
- The Things He Carried (SPCK Publishing, November 2008); ISBN 0-281-06080-0
- Do Nothing... Christmas is Coming: An Advent Calendar with a Difference (Church House Publishing, August 2008); ISBN 0-7151-4164-3
- Do Nothing to Change Your Life: Discovering What Happens When You Stop (Church House Publishing, May 2007); ISBN 0-7151-4118-X
- Abundance of the Heart: Catholic Evangelism for All Christians (Darton, Longman and Todd Ltd, May 2006); ISBN 0-232-52636-2
- I Thirst: The Cross - The Great Triumph of Love (Zondervan Publishing House, January 2004); ISBN 0-310-25069-2
- Praying through Life: How to Pray in the Home, at Work and in the Family (Church House Publishing; 2nd Revised edition, November 2003); ISBN 0-7151-4010-8
- On this Rock: Bible Foundations for Christian Living (The Bible Reading Fellowship, January 2003); ISBN 1-84101-238-6
- Travelling Well: A Companion Guide to the Christian Faith (Church House Publishing, June 2000); ISBN 0-7151-4935-0
- Catholic Evangelism (Affirming Catholicism) (Darton, Longman and Todd Ltd, March 1998); ISBN 0-232-52271-5
- Sacrament, Wholeness and Evangelism: A Catholic Approach (Grove Books Ltd, February 1996); ISBN 1-85174-309-X

Church of England titles
| Preceded by Dominic Walker | Bishop of Reading; 2004–2010 | Succeeded by Andrew Proud |
| Preceded by John Gladwin | Bishop of Chelmsford; 2010–2020 | Succeeded by Guli Francis-Dehqani |
| Preceded by John Sentamu | Archbishop of York; 2020–present | Incumbent |
Order of precedence in England and Wales
| Preceded by Alex Norris as Lord High Chancellor of Great Britain | Gentlemen as Archbishop of York | Succeeded by Andy Burnham as Prime Minister |
