= Papyrus Oxyrhynchus 243 =

Greek papyrus fragment

Papyrus Oxyrhynchus 243 (P. Oxy. 243 or P. Oxy. II 243) is a fragment containing a registration of a mortgage, written in Greek. It was discovered in Oxyrhynchus. The manuscript was written on papyrus in the form of a sheet. It is dated between 25 February and 24 March 79. Currently it is housed in the British Library (Department of Manuscripts, 790) in London.

== Description ==
The document was written by Chairemon, son of Chairemon, and was addressed to the agoranymus. It describes a mortgage issued by Didymus to Dionysius of 1,300 silver drachmae with some real property as security for a term of one year at an interest rate of one percent per month.

The most interesting aspect of the document historically is that it states explicitly that the rate of exchange between copper drachmae and silver was, at the time, 1800 to 4. The measurements of the fragment are 235 by 112 mm.

It was discovered by Grenfell and Hunt in 1897 in Oxyrhynchus. The text was published by Grenfell and Hunt in 1899.

== See also ==
- Oxyrhynchus Papyri
