= Agoranomos =

Market officials in the ancient Greek world

An agoranomos (Greek: ἀγορανόμος, plural: agoranomoi, ἀγορανόμοι) was an elected official in the cities of Ancient Greece and Byzantine Empire, responsible for order in the marketplace (agora, hence the name, translated as "market overseer"). A polis could have several of them. The position was similar to the Roman aedile.

Their duties included setting prices for certain goods, certifying goods and weights and scales, controlling money exchange, and the important function of managing the supply of the polis with grain. In controlling unscrupulous merchants, an agoranomos had the right to impose corporal punishment (and was often portrayed walking along the agora with a whip) on non-freeborn people, and fines on free citizens. An agoranomos also kept an eye on temples in the agora.

Ancient Athens had ten agronomoi, chosen annually. Five were responsible for the city, and five for the Piraeus.

Over time, agoranomos has also become an honorary title for a public benefactor, who contributed significant amounts for public institutions. The term is still in use today in modern Greece (Αγορονομία — Agoranomía), for the analogous in U.S. Center for Food Safety and Applied Nutrition, which is a branch of the Food and Drug Administration).

== See also ==
- Aedile - an elected Roman official with similar duties.
- Astynomos - a person in charge of public places outside the agora.
- Muhtasib - in Islamic world had similar (and some other) duties.
