= Oxyrhynchus Papyri 159 through 207 =

48 papyri published by Bernard Pyne Grenfell and Arthur Surridge Hunt

The Oxyrhynchus Papyri 159 through 207 are the 48 papyri published by Bernard Pyne Grenfell and Arthur Surridge Hunt in summary form at the end of the first volume of their monumental collection of documents recovered from Oxyrhynchus beginning in 1896. Many of these 48 were later examined and published in more detail, some by Grenfell and Hunt themselves, and some by other Egyptologists and scholars.

P. Oxy. I #	Century	Location	Other #s	Description	Lines
159	3rd	Haskell Oriental Institute	SB XXII 15349	Order from Aurelius Theon to Chaerammon to pay Pausanias 2000 drachmae for pitch.	8
160	2nd	Haskell Oriental Institute	SB VIII 9903	Letter from Diogenes to his sister Heliodora, announcing his arrival at Memphis.	21
161	3rd or 4th	Haskell Oriental Institute	P. Oxy. VI 938	Letter from Demetrius to his father Heraclides, blaming him for not sending 12 baskets of fodder, and requesting their immediate dispatch.	8
162	6th or 7th	Haskell Oriental Institute	P. Oxy. VI 942	Letter from Timotheus to Petronius explaining the reasons for his delay at Nilopolis.	7
163	2nd	Haskell Oriental Institute	P. Oxy. VI 931	Letter from Theopompus to Sarapion, strategus of the upper division (ἄνω τόπων) of the Sebennyte nome, stating that he had sent an ounce of purple.	17
164	3rd	The British Library	SB XXII 15350	Letter addressed to Apollonius, son of Zoilus, with reference to the termination of some dispute.	6
165	2 February 81	Cambridge University Library	SB XXII 15351	Letter from Taroutillius, the superintendent of allotments to the agoranomoi, announcing the cession of 20 arourae. Dated in the third year of the Emperor Titus Caesar Vespasianus	26
166	11 October 186	Bodleian Library	P. Oxy. III 501	Lease by Heraclides and Sarapion of a half share of 5 arourae held by them in common with a third person. The details resemble those of P. Oxy. 101. Dated in the 27th year of the Emperor Caesar Marcus Aurelius Commodus Antoninus Pius Felix Augustus Armeniacus Medicus Parthicus Sarmaticus Germanicus Maximus Britannicus (Commodus).	52
167	190-245	Bodleian Library	SB XXII 15352	Order to pay Heracles 1 1/4 artabae, 6 choenices of corn as a contribution for the twentieth year of an Emperor.	4
168	3rd	University of Pennsylvania Museum of Archaeology and Anthropology		An order from Saras to Dionysius to pay Zosimus 2 artabae of wheat.	4
169	3rd	Vassar College Library		An order to the archephodos (ἀρχέφοδος) of the village of Isionpanga to send up Thatres, son of Ptollion, for trial. See also P. Oxy. 64 and P. Oxy. 65.	3
170	2nd	Houghton Library		Letter from Claudius Antoninus to the agoranomi, requesting them to register a sale which had taken place.	13
171	2nd (146-7)	Cambridge University Library		The recto side is a census return, addressed to the strategus and Basilikos Grammateus. Dated in the tenth year of Antoninus Pius. The verso side is a list of names.	20
172	3rd	Department of Classical Studies, University of Melbourne		Order to an archephodos (ἀρχέφοδος) to hand over Dionysius, son of Panechotes, to the officer.	4
173	174	The University of St. Andrews		Announcement of a death along with a request that the dead person be struck from the tax rolls.	26
174	88	The Milton S. Eisenhower Library		Letter from Plutarchus to the agoranomi announcing a cession of land in the kliros (κλήρος) of Philistion.	34
175	95	Bristol City Museum		A letter from Phanias and Diogenes to the agoranomi, announcing a cession of land.	20
176	99	Musées Royaux, Fondation Egyptologique Reine Elisabeth, Brussels		Part of a letter to the agoranomi, similar to the previous.	14
177	6th	The Bodleian Library		A letter asking for windlasses.	5
178	2nd	Hamilton College Library		A letter to the clerk of the agoranomion from Seras, acknowledging the receipt of a will, which he wished to revoke.	15
179	3rd	The British Library	SB XXII 15357	A letter asking that something previously agreed upon should be sent. Written in an upright uncial hand.	8
180	3rd	Houghton Library	SB X 10754	The recto side is a fragment of an account. The verso side contains an order to Stephanus, a banker, to pay 40 drachmae in addition to 20 already paid, to Zoilos, a sailor, as the freight charge on 600 artabae of wheat.	13 recto, 4 verso
181	3rd	University of Pennsylvania Museum of Archaeology and Anthropology	SB XXII 15358	Invitation to a wedding feast.	5
182	4th	Bodleian Library	SB XXII 15359	Letter from Thonius to his wife and sister Thecla, referring to a payment of 20 talents.	18
183	257-263	Trinity College Library		The recto is a fragment of an official letter. The verso is an order to Heraclas, a banker, to pay Heracleus 200 drachmae for making bricks.	12 recto, 7 verso
184	2nd or 3rd	Trinity College Library		A letter from Agathodaemon, requesting the dispatch of 14 sheep in exchange for 260 drachmae. Agathodaemon blames the addressee for his conduct in a transaction involving the sale of some grass and a goat.	30
185	181	Glasgow University Library		A letter from Apollonius and Herminius to Herodes and the other managers of the public bank, authorizing them to receive the tax on the sale of a slave.	13
186	3rd	Bodleian Library		Accounts of payments to various people.	18
187	150	Department of Classical Studies, University of Melbourne	SB XX 15180	A letter from Irene to Parammon containing a list of items which he was to bring. Written in the same hand as Papyrus Oxyrhynchus 115 and Papyrus Oxyrhynchus 116.	12
188	117-138	Bodleian Library	SB XVI 13058	Letter from Heraclides to his father Horion about the purchase of a slave and a pair of Italian lamps. Written in a semi-uncial hand.	14
189	3rd	The British Library	SB XXII 15361	An order from Theonilla to Horion, a steward, to pay Silvanus some wine on condition of his paying what he owed.	10
190	6th or 7th	Cambridge University Library	P. Oxy. VII 1053 recto	The recto side contains an account. The verso contains an account of receipts from inhabitants of several villages.	11 recto, 19 verso
191	6th	Musées Royaux, Fondation Egyptologique Reine Elisabeth, Brussels	P. Oxy. VI 998	A list of reductions of payments granted to the inhabitants of various villages.	24
192	614-615	Cambridge University Library	SB XXII 15362	An acknowledgement addressed by Aurelius Apasion to Flavius Apion or his heirs of the loan of one solidus.	21
193	11 October 582	The British Library	P.Lond. III 774	An acknowledgement addressed to the heirs of Flavius Apion by Aurelius John, of the receipt of two large windlasses.	18
194	6th	University of Pennsylvania Museum of Archaeology and Anthropology		An acknowledgement addressed to Flavius Apion or his heirs by Aurelius Ptollion of the loan of one solidus.	26
195	12 September 567	The British Library	P.Lond. III 775	An acknowledgement from Aurelius Epimachus to Flavius Apion of the receipt of some kind of machine for irrigation.	15
196	7th	University Library of Graz	P. Oxy. VI 999	An account of receipts and expenditures on estates belonging to Flavius Apion.	22
197	13 September 552	The British Library	P.Lond. III 776	An acknowledgement from Aurelius Sourus to Flavius Apion of the receipt of two windlasses and another item.	24
198	11 October 582	The British Library	P.Lond. III 777	A contract between the heirs of Flavius Apion and Aurelius Macarius.	14
199	28 July 568	The British Library	P.Lond. III 778	An agreement between Flavius Apion and Georgius, a deacon. They agreed that Georgius would become surety that Aurelius Onnophris would remain on his holding.	19
200	6th	Houghton Library	SB XII 10944	An agreement, similar to the previous one, addressed to Flavius Apion or his heirs stating that Jeremias, Apoll[onius?], and a third person, would be sureties that Aurelius Apasirius would remain on his holding.	15
201	27 September 593	The British Library	SB XXII 15363	The beginning of a contract addressed to Flavius Apion (the younger).	6
202	8 October 582	Cambridge University Library	SB XXII 15364	An acknowledgement addressed to the heirs of Flavius Apion by Aurelius Bartholomaeus, of the receipt of one windlass.	23
203	6th or 7th	Harold Cohen Library	P. Oxy. VIII 1164	A letter about a dispute concerning the ownership of a camel.	15
204	7th	Edinburgh University Library	SB XXII 15365	List in two columns.	27
205	18 February 535	The British Library	SB XXII 15366	A receipt from the banker Philoxenus for a payment made by Pamouthius of money taxes.	11
206	17 January 535	Beinecke Rare Book and Manuscript Library	SB XXII 15367	A receipt for a loan made by Pamouthius to John.	6
207	27 October 590	The British Library	SB XXII 15368	A receipt for the payment of four knidia (κνίδια) of wine from Phoebammon to Alexander for nine days' work.	3

== See also ==
- Oxyrhynchus Papyri
