= Ancient Greek literature =

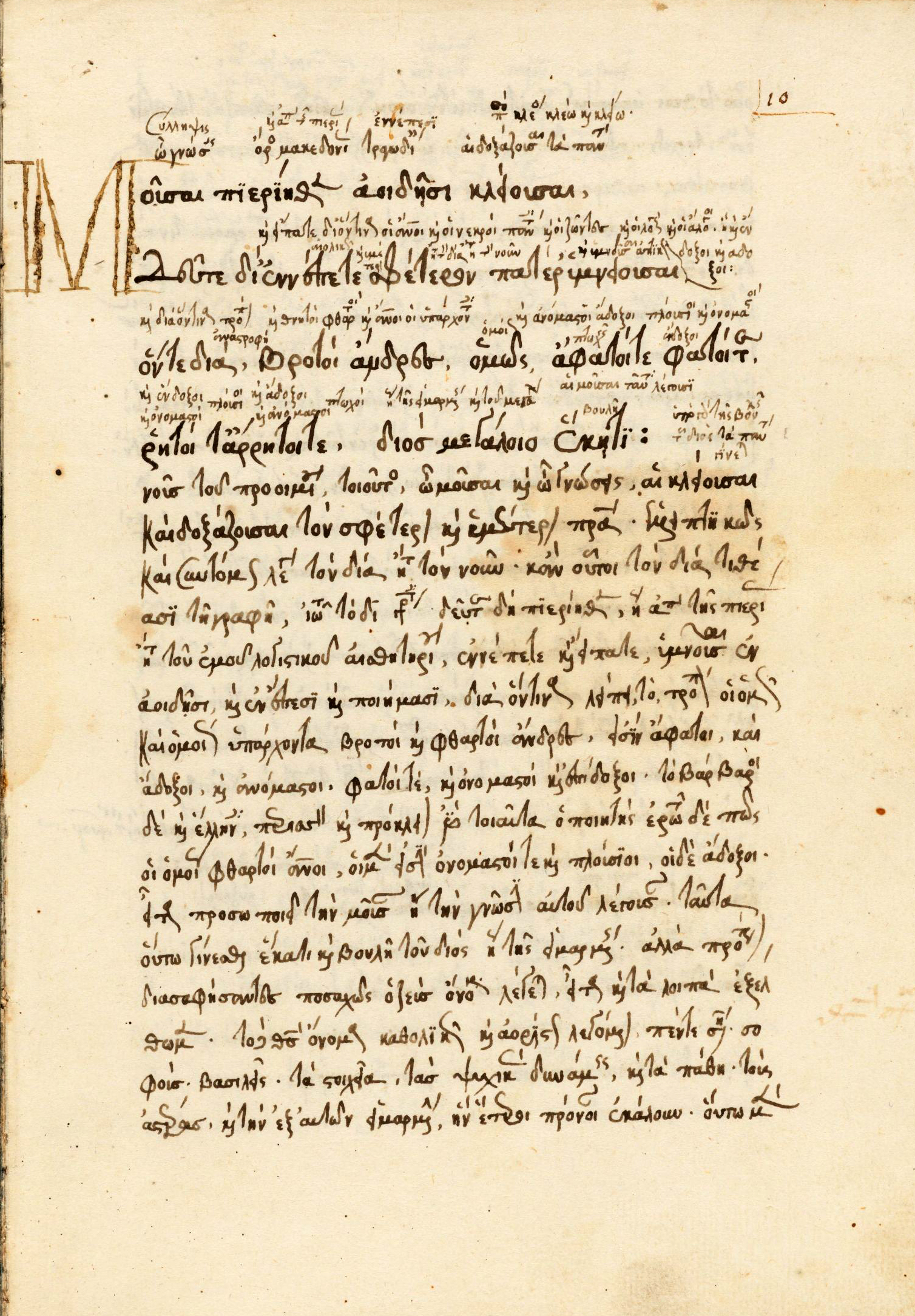
A Greek manuscript of the beginning of Hesiod's Works and Days

Ancient Greek literature encompasses the literature written in the Ancient Greek language from the earliest texts until the time of the Byzantine Empire. The earliest surviving works of ancient Greek literature, dating back to the early Archaic period, are the two epic poems the Iliad and the Odyssey, set in an idealized archaic past today identified as having some relation to the Mycenaean era. These two epics, along with the Homeric Hymns and the two poems of Hesiod, the Theogony and Works and Days, constituted the major foundations of the Greek literary tradition that would continue into the Classical, Hellenistic, and Roman periods.

The lyric poets Sappho, Alcaeus, and Pindar were highly influential during the early development of the Greek poetic tradition. Aeschylus is the earliest Greek tragic playwright for whom any plays have survived complete. Sophocles is famous for his tragedies about Oedipus, particularly Oedipus the King and Antigone. Euripides is known for his plays which often pushed the boundaries of the tragic genre. The comedic playwright Aristophanes wrote in the genre of Old Comedy, while the later playwright Menander was an early pioneer of New Comedy. The historians Herodotus of Halicarnassus and Thucydides, who both lived during the fifth century BC, wrote accounts of events that happened shortly before and during their own lifetimes. The philosopher Plato wrote dialogues, usually centered around his teacher Socrates, dealing with various philosophical subjects, whereas his student Aristotle wrote numerous treatises, which later became highly influential.

Important later writers included Apollonius of Rhodes, who wrote The Argonautica, an epic poem about the voyage of the Argonauts; Archimedes, who wrote groundbreaking mathematical treatises; and Plutarch, who wrote mainly biographies and essays. The second-century AD writer Lucian of Samosata was a Greek, who wrote primarily works of satire. Ancient Greek literature has had a profound impact on later Greek literature and also on western literature at large. In particular, many ancient Roman authors drew inspiration from their Greek predecessors. Ever since the Renaissance, European authors in general, including Dante Alighieri, William Shakespeare, John Milton, and James Joyce, have all drawn heavily on classical themes and motifs.

== History ==
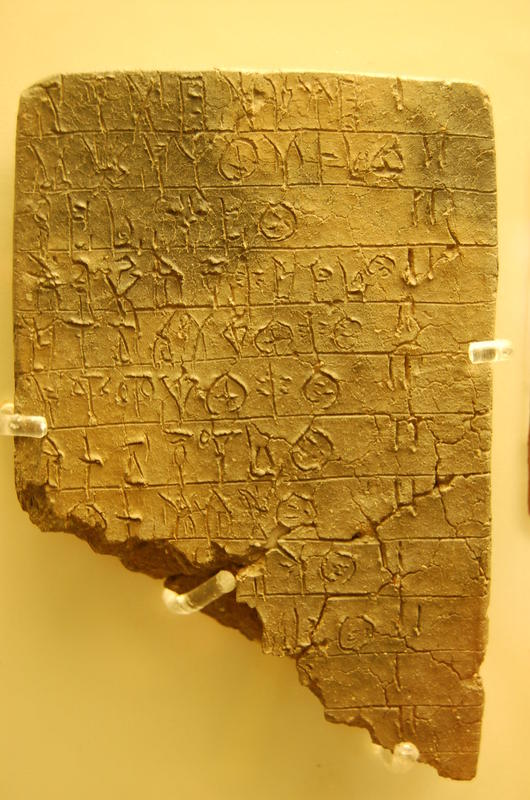
Linear B tablet from the Archaeological Museum of Mycenae

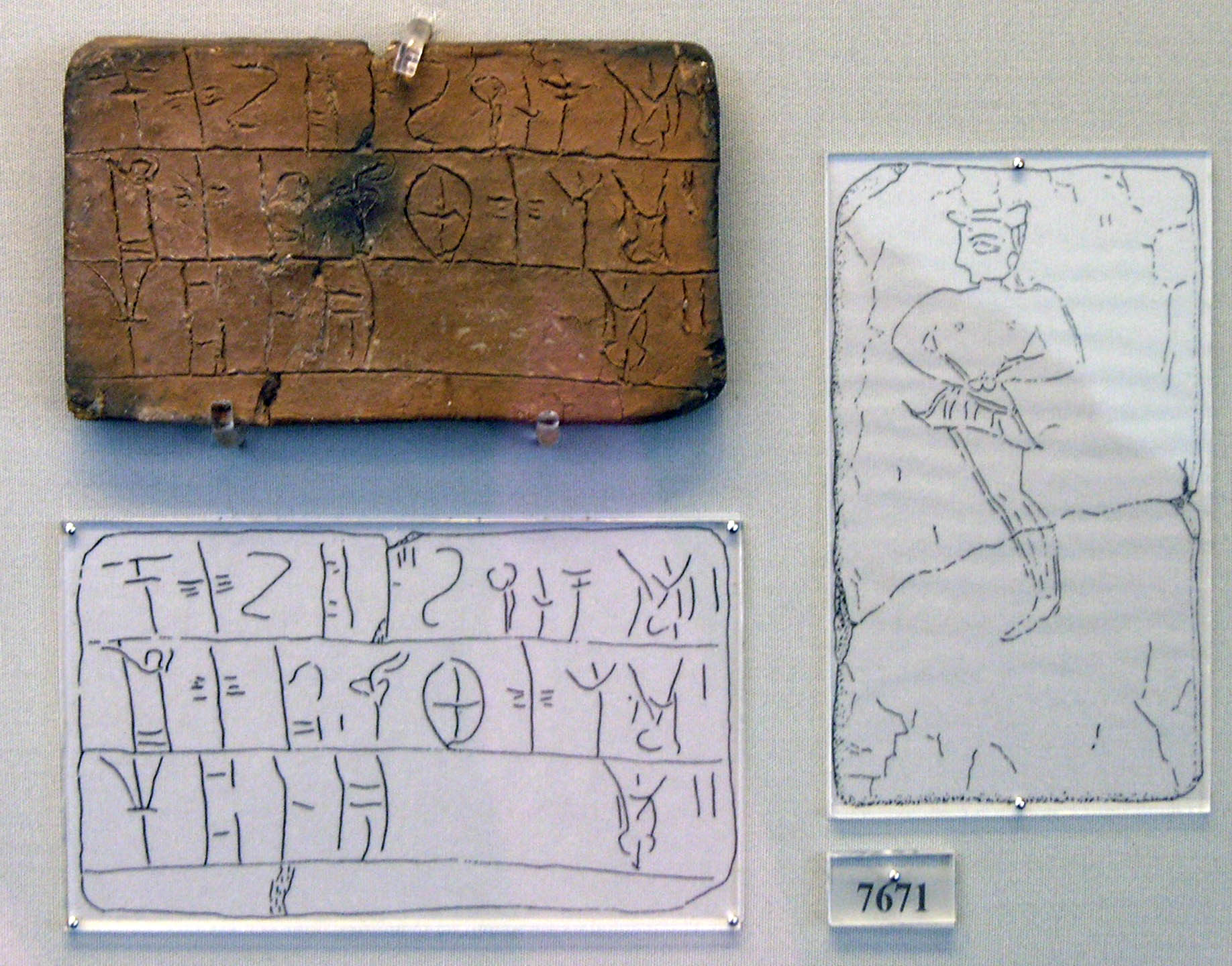
Tablet MY Oe 106 (obverse) exhibited at the Greek National Archaeological Museum

=== Early writings ===
The earliest known Greek writings are Mycenaean, written in the Linear B syllabary on clay tablets. These documents contain prosaic records largely concerned with trade (lists, inventories, receipts, etc.); no real literature has been discovered. Michael Ventris and John Chadwick, the original decipherers of Linear B, state that literature almost certainly existed in Mycenaean Greece, but it was either not written down or, if it was, it was on parchment or wooden tablets, which did not survive the destruction of the Mycenaean palaces in the twelfth century BC.

=== Hellenistic ===
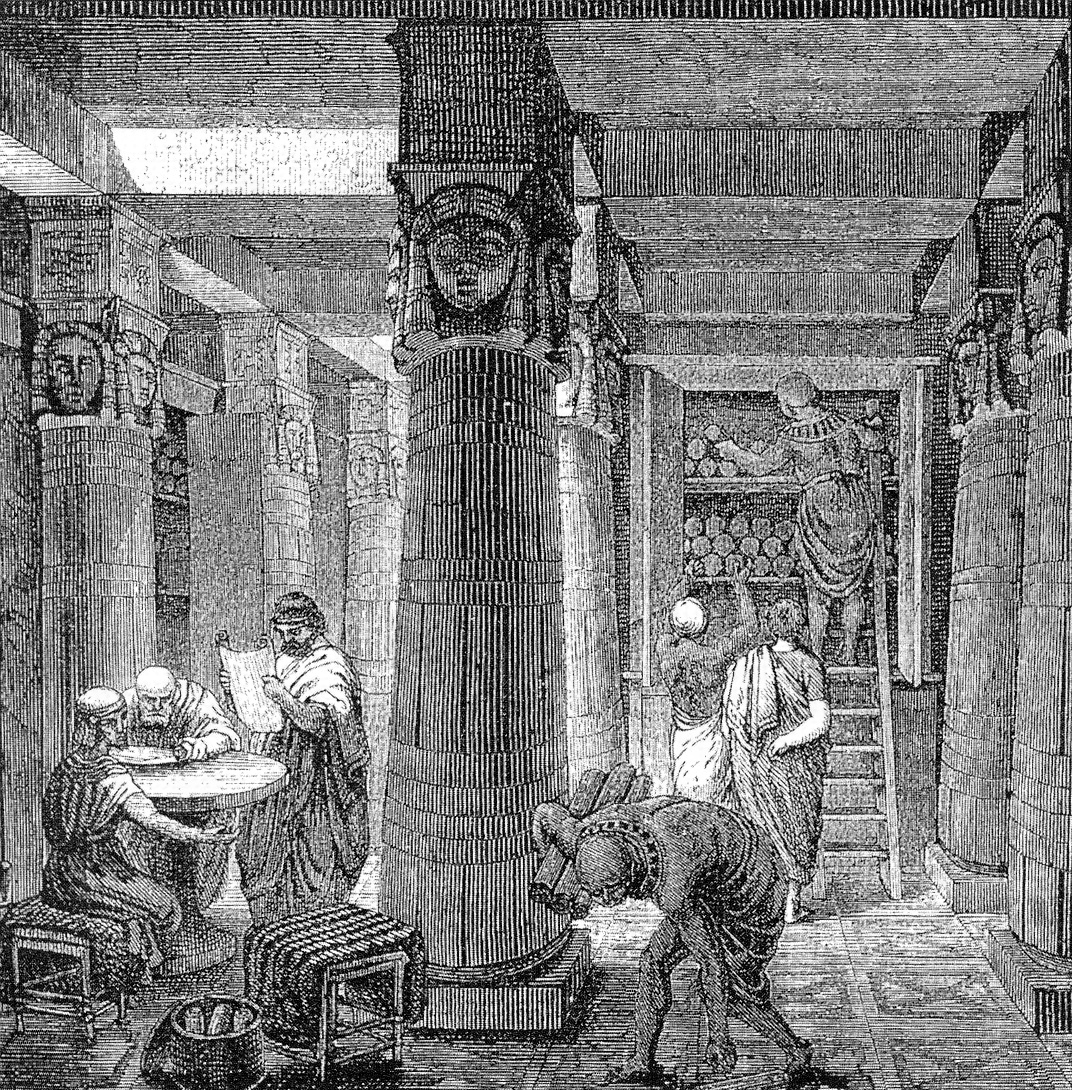
Imaginative nineteenth-century engraving of the ancient Library of Alexandria

In the Hellenistic period, after the conquests of Alexander the Great, Athens lost its preeminent status as the leader of Greek culture to the city of Alexandria, in northern Egypt. The Musaeum, or Shrine to the Muses, which included the library and school, was founded by Ptolemy I. The institution was from the beginning intended as a great international school and library. The library, eventually containing more than a half million volumes, was mostly in Greek. It was intended to serve as a repository for every work of classical Greek literature that could be found.

=== Roman ===
While the transition from city-state to empire affected philosophy a great deal, shifting the emphasis from political theory to personal ethics, Greek letters continued to flourish under Roman rule. Romans of literary or rhetorical inclination looked to Greek models, and Greek literature of all types continued to be read and produced both by native speakers of Greek and later by Roman authors as well. A notable characteristic of this period was the expansion of literary criticism as a genre, particularly as exemplified by Demetrius, Pseudo-Longinus and Dionysius of Halicarnassus.

== Poetry ==
=== Early epic poetry ===
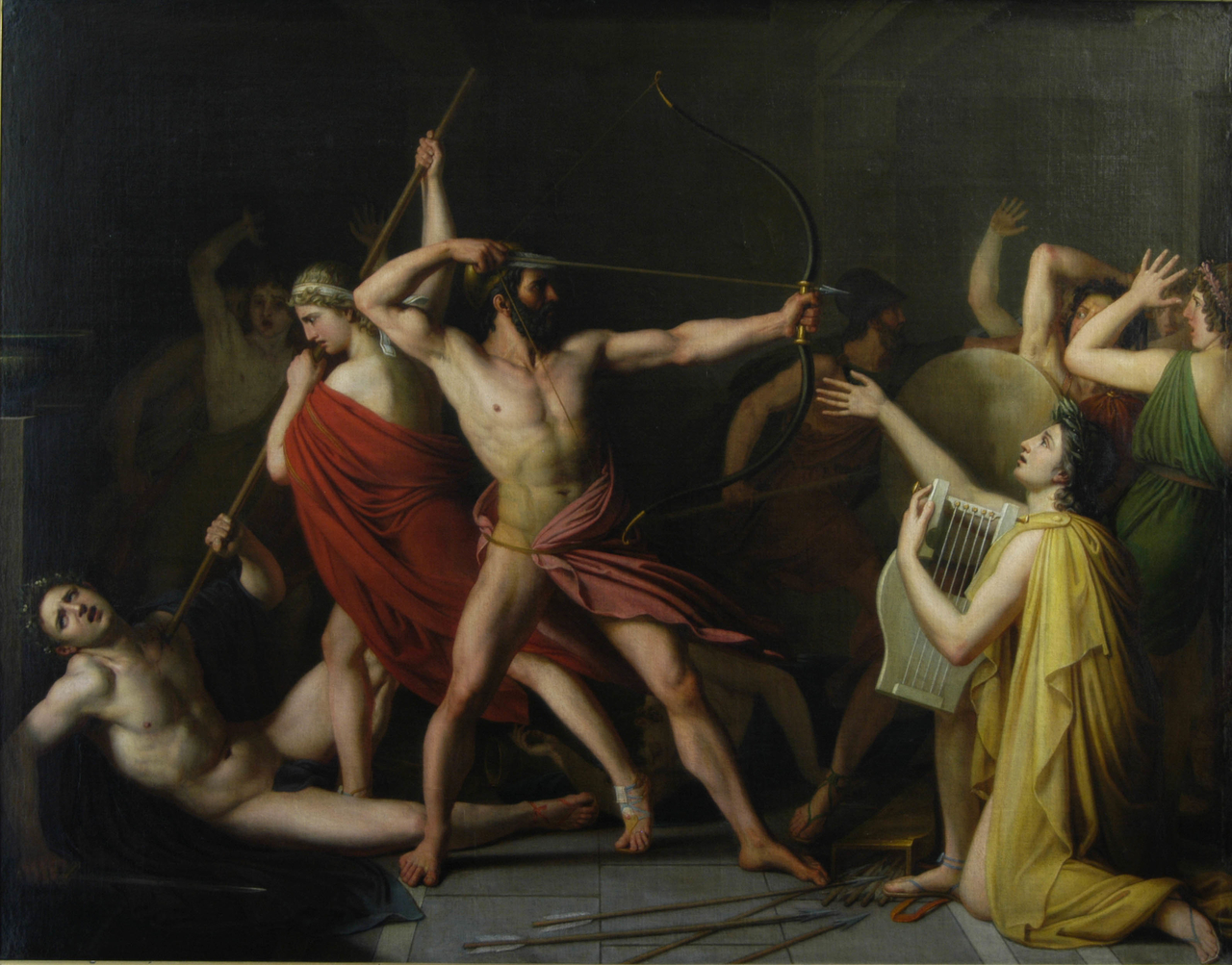
A painting by the French Neoclassical painter Thomas Degeorge depicting the climactic final scene from Book Twenty-Two of The Odyssey in which Odysseus, Telemachus, Eumaeus, and Philoetius slaughter the suitors of Penelope

At the beginning of Greek literature stand the two monumental works: the Iliad and the Odyssey. Although the works as they now stand are credited to a single poet named Homer, both of these works were based on ancient legends, and it is certain that their roots reach far back before his time (see Homeric Question). The Iliad is a narrative of a single episode spanning over the course of a ten-day-period from near the end of the ten years of the Trojan War. It centers on the person of Achilles, who embodied the Greek heroic ideal. The Odyssey is an account of the adventures of Odysseus, one of the warriors at Troy. After ten years fighting the war, he spends another ten years sailing back home to his wife and family. During his ten-year voyage, he loses all of his comrades and ships and makes his way home to Ithaca disguised as a beggar. These works are written in dactylic hexameter verse, in the Homeric dialect of ancient Greek, a mixture of the Ionic dialect and some elements of the Aeolic and Attic dialects, the latter due to the Athenian edition of the 6th century BC.

The other great poet of the preclassical period was Hesiod, a native of Boeotia in central Greece, and is thought to have lived and worked around 700 BC. Hesiod's two extant poems are Works and Days and the Theogony. Works and Days is a faithful depiction of the poverty-stricken country life he knew so well, and it sets forth principles and rules for farmers. It vividly describes the ages of mankind, beginning with a long-past Golden Age. The Theogony is a systematic account of creation and of the gods.Unlike Homer, Hesiod refers to himself in his poetry. Nonetheless, nothing is known about him from any external source.

The writings of Homer and Hesiod were held in extremely high regard throughout antiquity and were viewed by many ancient authors as the foundational texts behind ancient Greek religion; Homer told the story of a heroic past, which Hesiod bracketed with a creation narrative and an account of the practical realities of contemporary daily life.

=== Elegy and iambus ===
Elegiac poetry and iambic poetry were both written in the Ionic dialect. Elegiac poems were written in elegiac couplets and iambic poems were written in iambic trimeter. The most important iambic poet was Archilochus of Paros (7th century BC). Only fragments remain of his work, as is the case with most of the poets. The few remnants suggest that he was an embittered adventurer who led a very turbulent life.

=== Lyric poetry ===
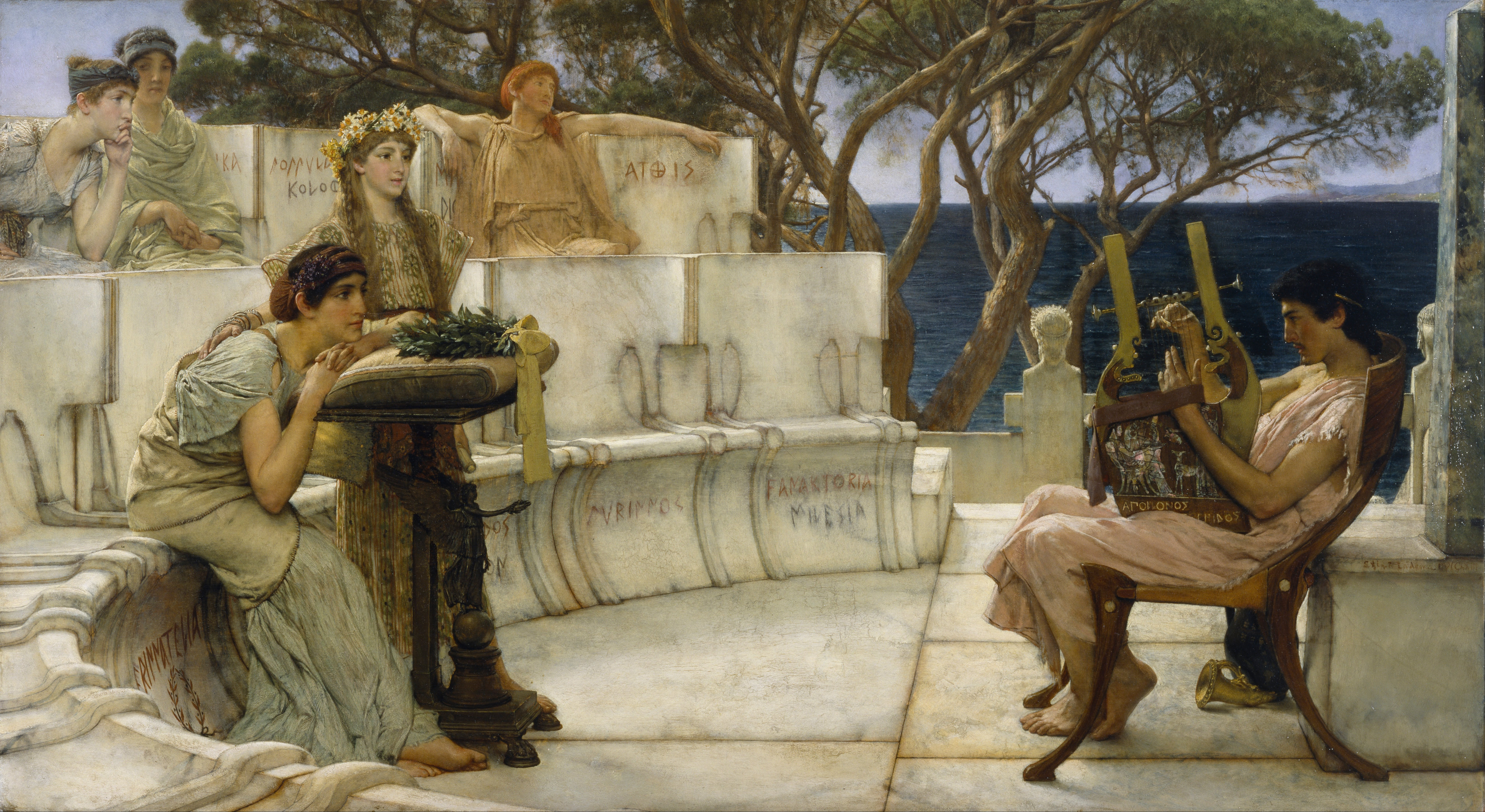
A nineteenth-century painting by the English painter Sir Lawrence Alma-Tadema depicting the poet Sappho gazing on in admiration as the poet Alcaeus plays the lyre

Lyric poetry received its name from the fact that it was originally sung by individuals or a chorus accompanied by the instrument called the lyre. Lyric poems often employed highly varied poetic meters.

The most famous of all lyric poets were the so-called "Nine Lyric Poets". Of all the lyric poets, Sappho of Lesbos (c. 630 – c. 570 BC), who wrote in the Aeolic dialect, was by far the most widely revered. In antiquity, her poems were regarded with the same degree of respect as the poems of Homer. Only one of her poems, "Ode to Aphrodite", has survived to the present day in its original, completed form. In addition to Sappho, her contemporary Alcaeus of Lesbos was also notable for monodic lyric poetry.

The poetry written by Alcman was written in the Doric dialect. The later poet Pindar of Thebes was renowned for his choral lyric poetry.

=== Hellenistic poetry ===
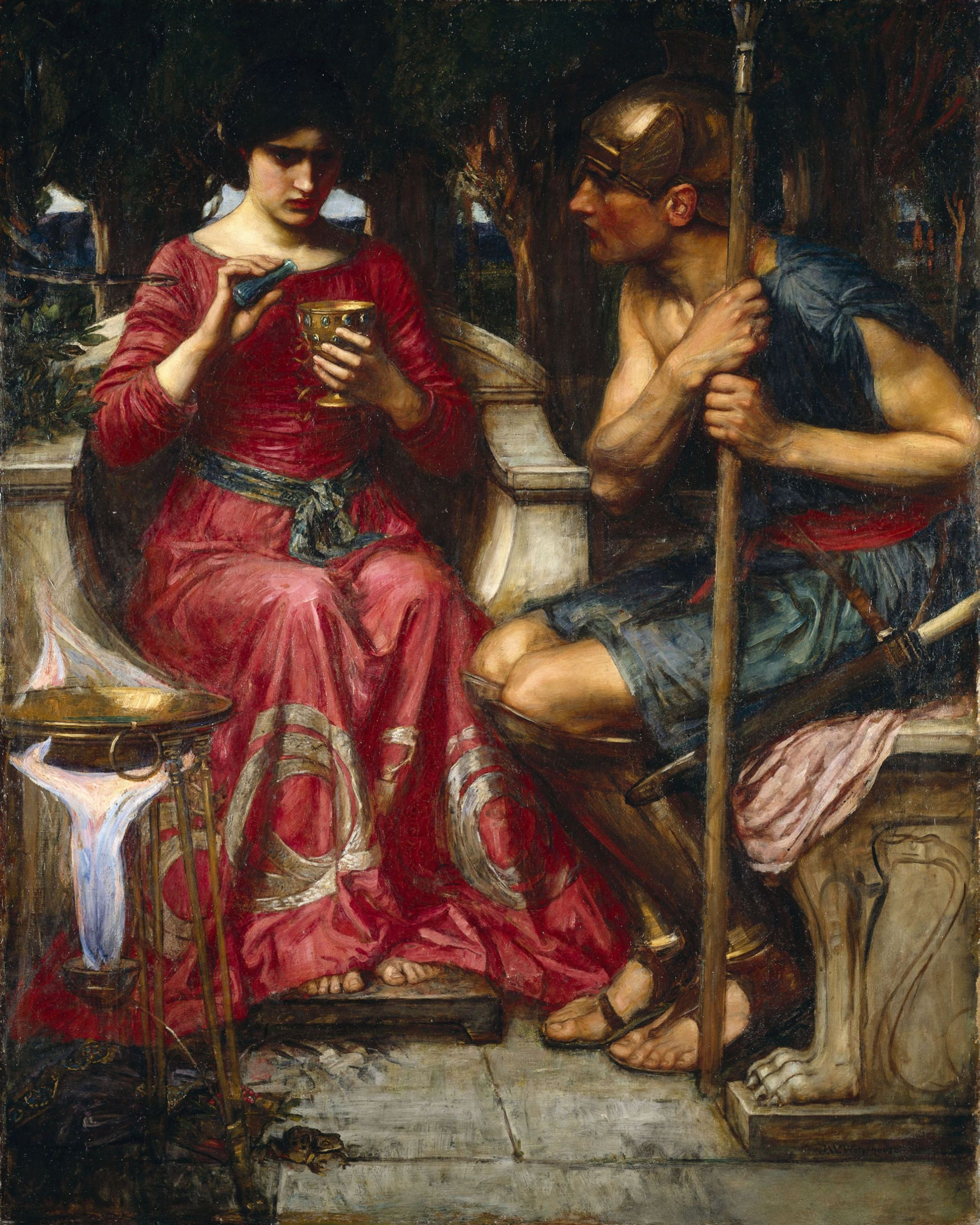
A painting by John William Waterhouse depicting a scene from The Argonautica by Apollonius of Rhodes

The genre of bucolic poetry was first developed by the poet Theocritus. The Roman Virgil later wrote his Eclogues in this genre.

Callimachus, a scholar at the Library of Alexandria, composed the Aetia ("Causes"), a long poem written in four volumes of elegiac couplets describing the legendary origins of obscure customs, festivals, and names. Callimachus also wrote short poems for special occasions and at least one short epic, the Ibis, which was directed against his former pupil Apollonius.

The Alexandrian poet Apollonius of Rhodes is best known for his epic poem the Argonautica, which narrates the adventures of Jason and his shipmates the Argonauts on their quest to retrieve the Golden Fleece from the land of Colchis. The poet Aratus wrote the hexameter poem Phaenomena, a poetic rendition of Eudoxus of Cnidus's treatise on the stars written in the fourth century BC.

=== Late Antique epic poetry ===
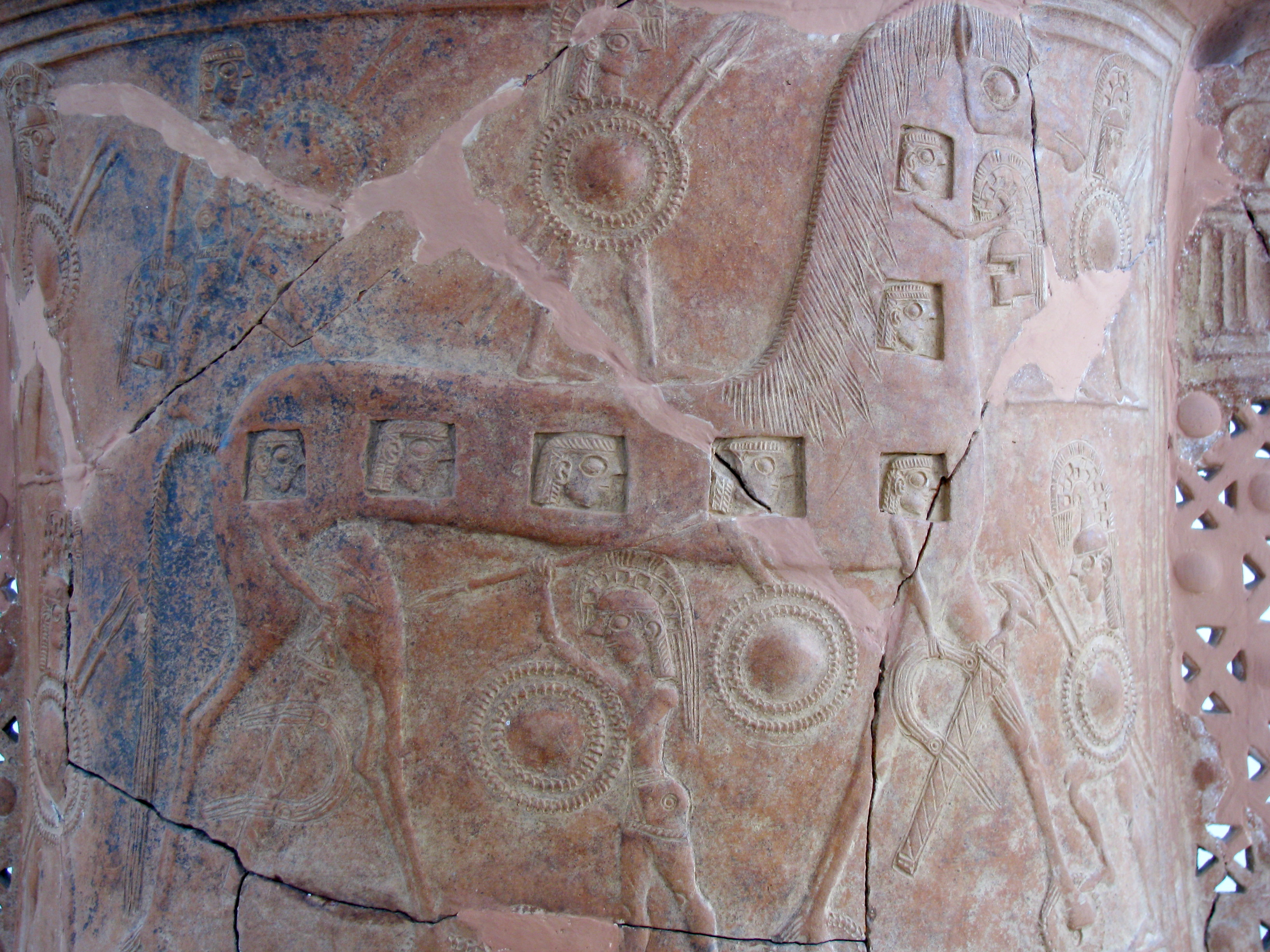
The Mykonos vase, one of the earliest surviving depictions of the myth of the Trojan Horse, a myth which is described in depth in Quintus of Smyrna's Posthomerica

The poet Quintus of Smyrna, who probably lived during the late fourth century AD, wrote Posthomerica, an epic poem narrating the story of the fall of Troy, beginning where the Iliad left off. About the same time and in a similar Homeric style, an unknown poet composed the Blemyomachia, a now fragmentary epic about conflict between Romans and Blemmyes.

The poet Nonnus of Panopolis wrote the Dionysiaca, the longest surviving epic poem from antiquity. He also wrote a poetic paraphrase of The Gospel of John. Nonnus probably lived sometime during the late fourth century AD or early fifth century AD.

== Drama ==
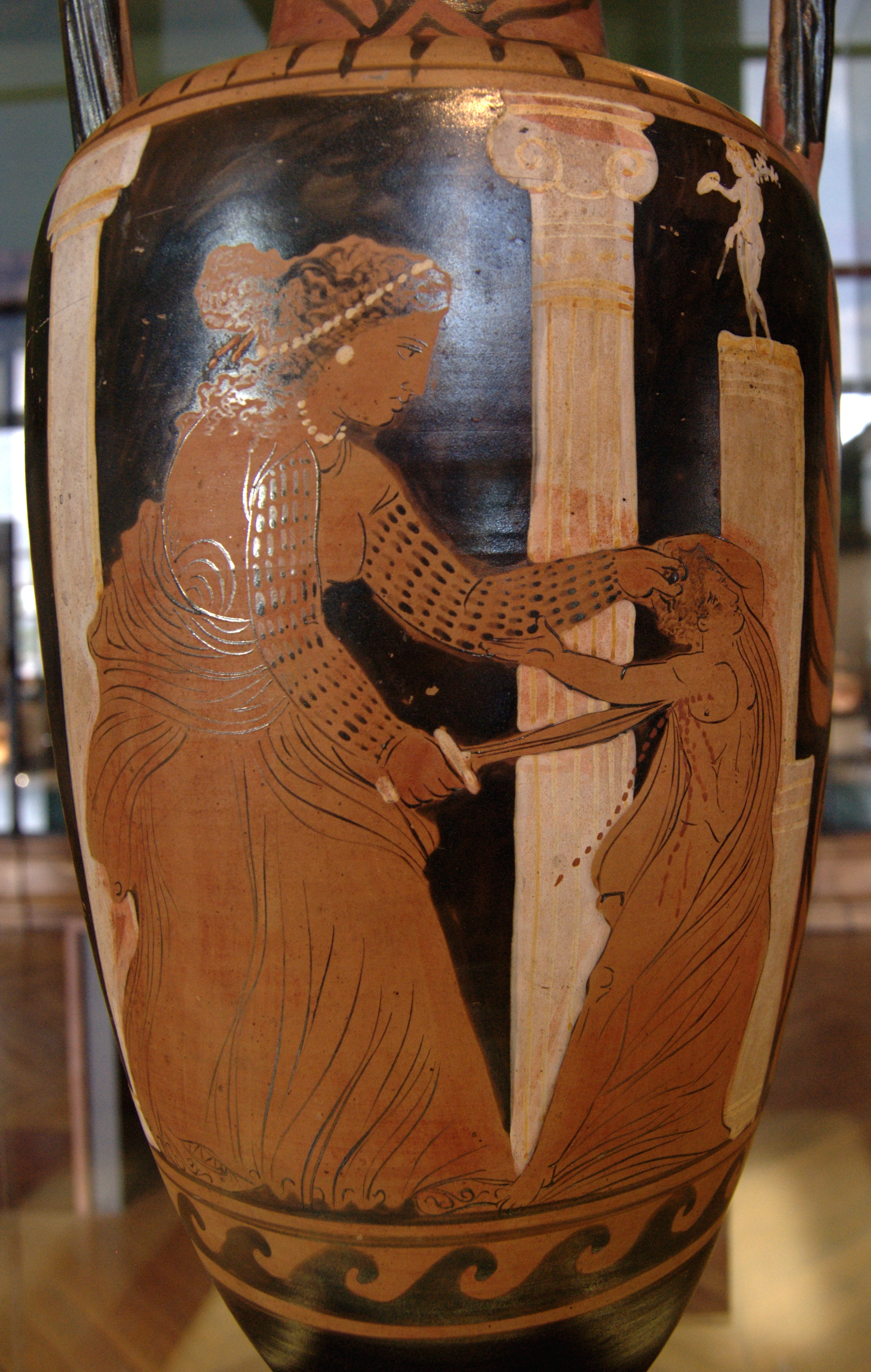
Medea kills her son (a scene from Euripides's Medea), Campanian red-figure amphora, c. 330 BC, Louvre (K 300)

All surviving works of Greek drama were composed by playwrights from Athens and are written exclusively in the Attic dialect. Choral performances were a common tradition in all Greek city-states. The Athenians credited a man named Thespis with having invented drama by introducing the first actor, whose primary purpose was to interact with the leader of the chorus. Later playwrights expanded the number of actors to three, allowing for greater freedom in storytelling.

=== Tragedy ===
In the age that followed the Greco-Persian Wars, the awakened national spirit of Athens was expressed in hundreds of tragedies based on heroic and legendary themes of the past. The tragic plays grew out of simple choral songs and dialogues performed at festivals of the god Dionysus. In the classical period, performances included three tragedies and one pastoral drama, depicting four different episodes of the same myth. Wealthy citizens were chosen to bear the expense of costuming and training the chorus as a public and religious duty. Attendance at the festival performances was regarded as an act of worship. Performances were held in the great open-air theater of Dionysus in Athens. The poets competed for the prizes offered for the best plays.

All fully surviving Greek tragedies are conventionally attributed to Aeschylus, Sophocles or Euripides. The authorship of Prometheus Bound, which is traditionally attributed to Aeschylus, and Rhesus, which is traditionally attributed to Euripides, are, however, questioned.

There are seven surviving tragedies attributed to Aeschylus, three of which Agamemnon, The Libation-Bearers, and The Eumenides, form a trilogy known as the Oresteia. Prometheus Bound, however, may actually be the work of Aeschylus's son Euphorion.

Seven works of Sophocles have survived, the most acclaimed of which are the three Theban plays, Oedipus the King, Oedipus at Colonus, and Antigone all of which center around the story of Oedipus and his offspring.

There are nineteen surviving plays attributed to Euripides, the most well-known are Medea, Hippolytus, and Bacchae. Rhesus is sometimes thought to have been written by Euripides' son, or to have been a posthumous reproduction of a play by Euripides. Euripides pushed the limits of the tragic genre and many of the elements in his plays were more typical of comedy than tragedy.

=== Comedy ===
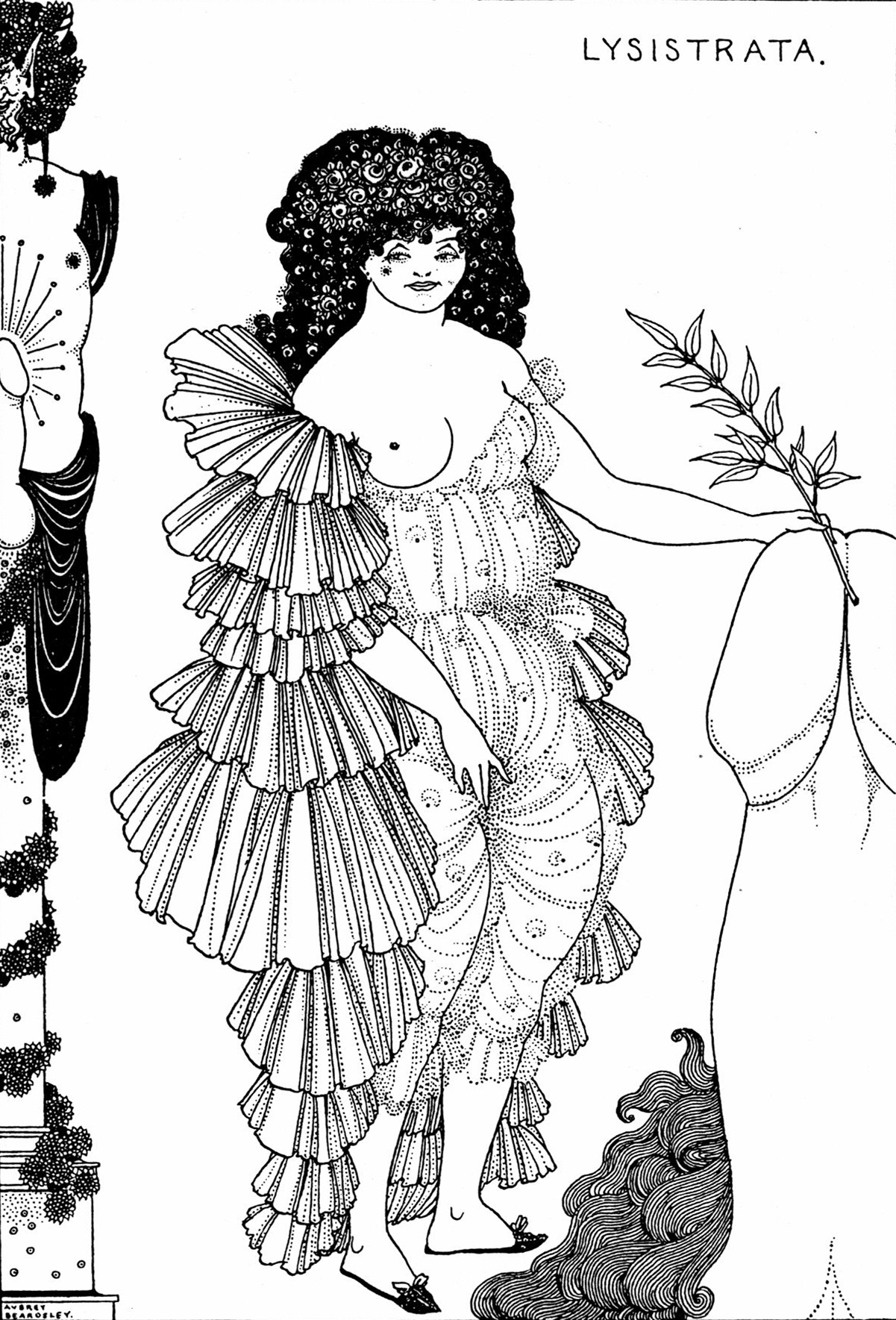
Illustration for Aristophanes's Lysistrata by Aubrey Beardsley (1896)

Like tragedy, comedy arose from a ritual in honor of Dionysus, but in this case the plays were full of frank obscenity, abuse, and insult. At Athens, the comedies became an official part of the festival celebration in 486 BC, and prizes were offered for the best productions. As with the tragedians, few works remain of the great comedic writers.

==== Old Comedy ====
The only complete surviving works of old comedy are eleven plays written by the playwright Aristophanes. Aristophanes poked fun at everyone and every institution. In The Birds, he ridicules Athenian democracy. In The Clouds, he attacks the philosopher Socrates. In Lysistrata, he denounces war. In The Frogs, he satirizes the tragedians Aeschylus and Euripides.

==== New Comedy ====
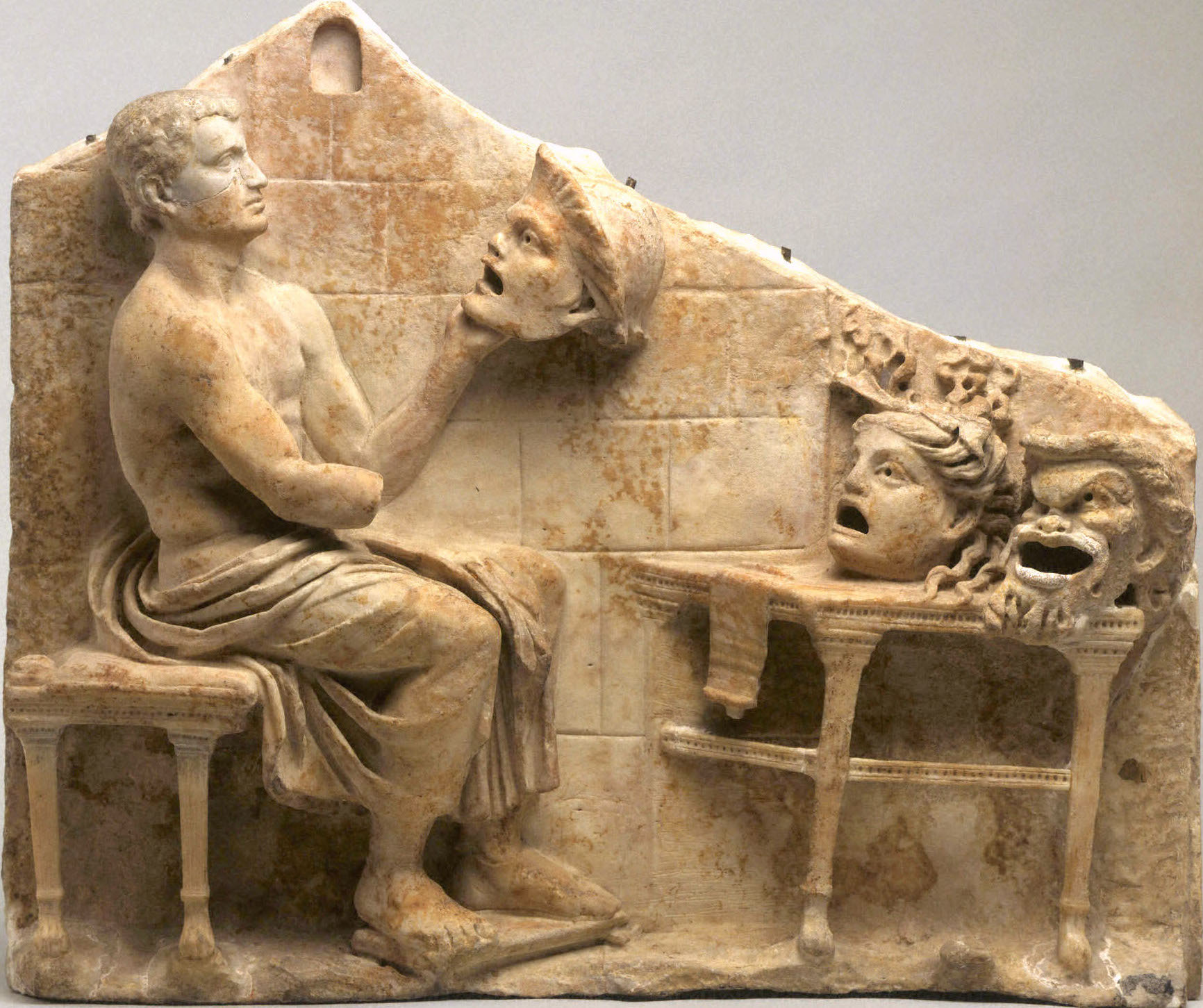
Republican or Early Imperial relief depicting a seating Menander holding the masks of New Comedy (1st century BC – early 1st century AD) Princeton University Art Museum

During the Hellenistic period, the Old Comedy of the Classical Era was replaced by New Comedy. The most notable writer of New Comedy was the Athenian playwright Menander. None of Menander's plays have survived to the present day in their complete form, but one play, The Bad-Tempered Man, has survived to the present day in a near-complete form. Most of another play entitled The Girl from Samos and large portions of another five have also survived.

=== Satyr plays ===
The third dramatic genre was the satyr play. Although the genre was popular, only one complete example of a satyr play has survived: Cyclops by Euripides. Large portions of a second satyr play, Ichneutae by Sophocles, have been recovered from the site of Oxyrhynchus in Egypt among the Oxyrhynchus Papyri.

== Historiography ==
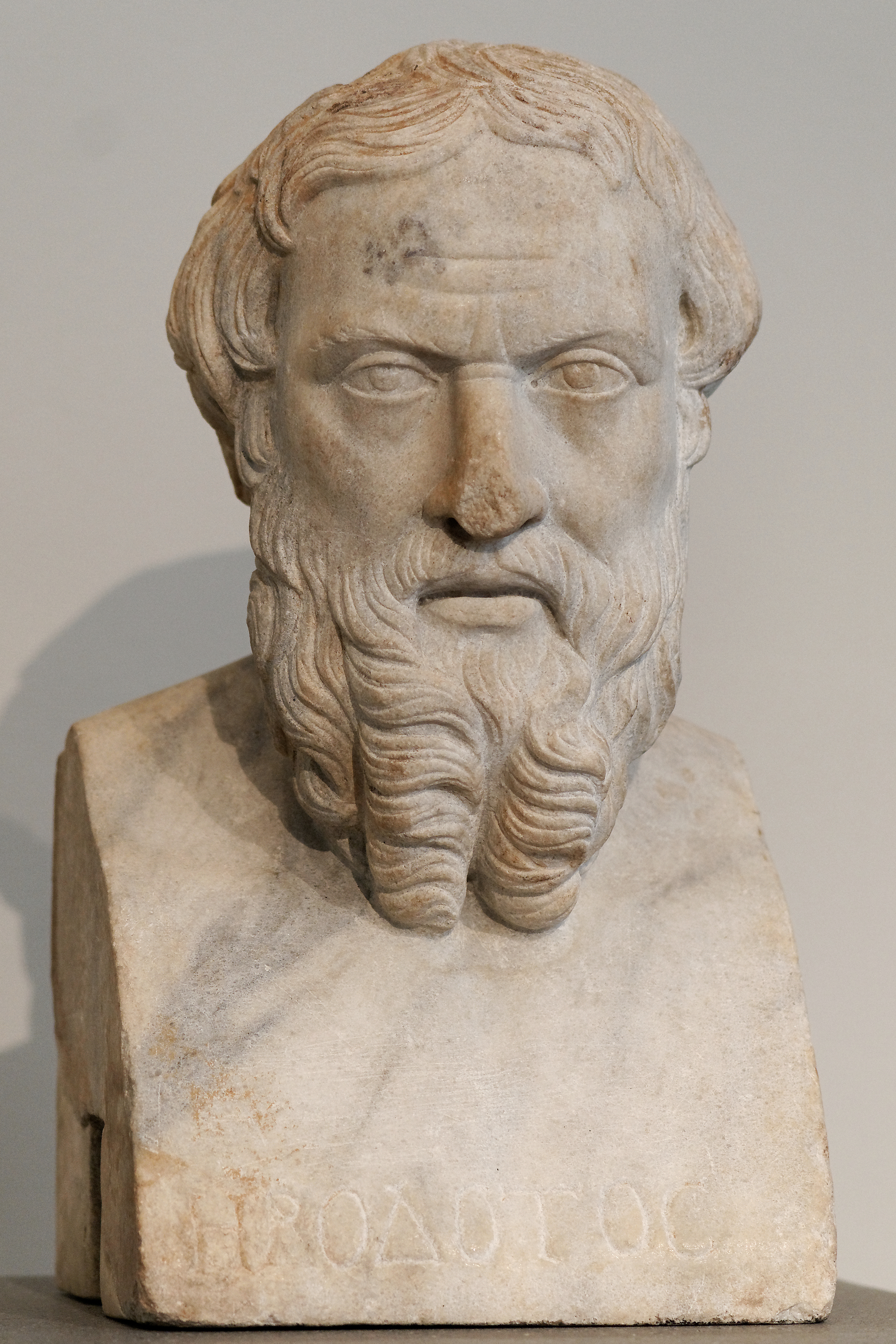
A second century AD Roman copy of a Greek bust of Herodotus from the first half of the fourth century BC

Prose literature can largely be said to begin with Herodotus; his book The Histories is among the oldest works of prose literature in existence.

Thucydides's book History of the Peloponnesian War greatly influenced later writers and historians, including the author of the book of Acts of the Apostles and the Byzantine Era historian Procopius of Caesarea.

A third historian of ancient Greece, Xenophon of Athens, began his Hellenica where Thucydides ended his work about 411 BC and carried his history to 362 BC. Xenophon's most famous work is his book The Anabasis, a detailed, first-hand account of his participation in a Greek mercenary army that tried to help the Persian Cyrus expel his brother from the throne, another famous work relating to Persian history is his Cyropaedia.

The historian Timaeus was born in Sicily but spent most of his life in Athens. His History, though lost, is significant because of its influence on Polybius. In 38 books it covered the history of Sicily and Italy to the year 264 BC, which is where Polybius begins his work. Timaeus also wrote the Olympionikai, a valuable chronological study of the Olympic Games.

The historian Polybius was born about 200 BC. He was brought to Rome as a hostage in 168. In Rome he became a friend of the general Scipio Aemilianus. He probably accompanied the general to Spain and North Africa in the wars against Carthage. He was with Scipio at the destruction of Carthage in 146.

Diodorus Siculus was a Greek historian who lived in the 1st century BC, around the time of Julius Caesar and Augustus. He wrote a universal history, Bibliotheca Historica, in 40 books. Of these, the first five and the 11th through the 20th remain. The first two parts covered history through the early Hellenistic era. The third part takes the story to the beginning of Caesar's wars in Gaul, now France.

Dionysius of Halicarnassus lived late in the first century BC. His history of Rome from its origins to the First Punic War (264 to 241 BC) is written from a Roman point of view, but it is carefully researched. He also wrote a number of other treatises, including On Imitation, Commentaries on the Ancient Orators, and On the Arrangement of Words.

The historians Appian of Alexandria and Arrian of Nicomedia both lived in the second century AD. Appian wrote on Rome and its conquests, while Arrian is remembered for his work on the campaigns of Alexander the Great. Arrian served in the Roman army. His book therefore concentrates heavily on the military aspects of Alexander's life. Arrian also wrote a philosophical treatise, the Diatribai, based on the teachings of his mentor Epictetus.

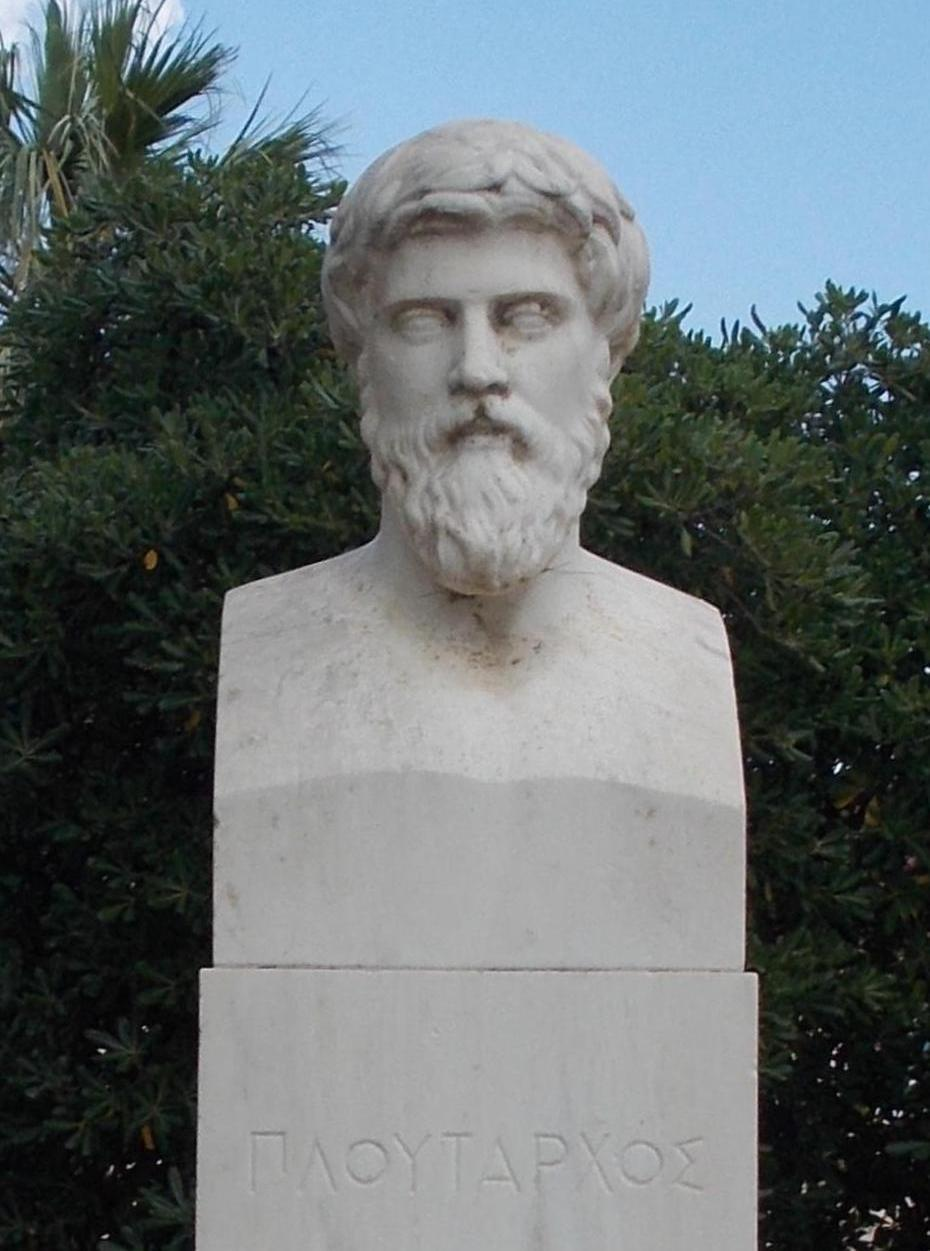
A bust of Plutarch, one of the most famous ancient Greek historians, from his hometown of Chaeronea

Ancient biography, or bios, as distinct from modern biography, was a genre of Greek (and Roman) literature interested in describing the goals, achievements, failures, and character of ancient historical persons and whether or not they should be imitated. Authors of ancient bios, such as Plutarch's Parallel Lives imitated many of the same sources and techniques of the contemporary historiographies of ancient Greece, notably including the works of Herodotus and Thucydides. There were various forms of ancient biographies, including philosophical biographies that brought out the moral character of their subject, literary biographies which discussed the lives of orators and poets (such as Philostratus's Lives of the Sophists), school and reference biographies that offered a short sketch of someone including their ancestry, major events and accomplishments, and death, autobiographies, commentaries and memoirs where the subject presents his own life, and historical/political biography focusing on the lives of those active in the military, among other categories.

Plutarch's other surviving work is the Moralia, a collection of essays on ethical, religious, political, physical, and literary topics.

During later times, so-called "commonplace books", usually describing historical anecdotes, became quite popular. Surviving examples of this popular genre include works such as Aulus Gellius's Attic Nights, Athenaeus of Naucratis's Deipnosophistae, and Claudius Aelianus's De Natura Animalium and Varia Historia.

== Philosophy ==
Among the earliest Greek philosophers were the three so-called "Milesian philosophers": Thales of Miletus, Anaximander, and Anaximenes. Of these philosophers' writings, however, only one fragment from Anaximander preserved by Simplicius of Cilicia has survived.

Many important and influential philosophers lived during the fifth centuries BC: A large portion of the philosophical poem On Nature written by Empedocles of Acragas has survived, making Empedocles one of the most widely attested Pre-Socratic philosophers. A large number of fragments written by the philosophers Heraclitus of Ephesus and Democritus of Abdera have also survived.

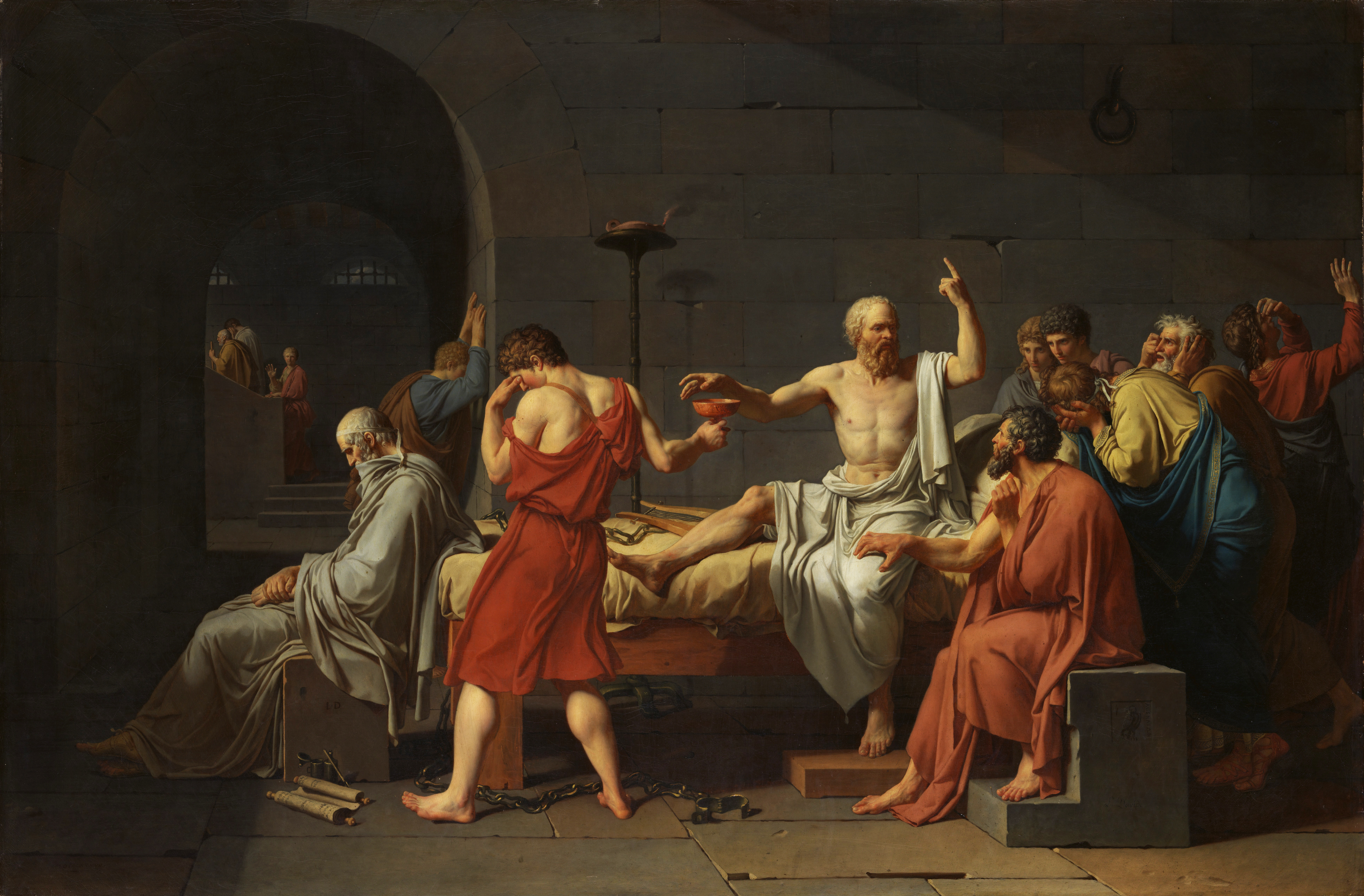
The Death of Socrates, by Jacques-Louis David (1787)

Of all the classical philosophers whose writing survive, Plato and Aristotle are generally considered the most important and influential.

Plato expressed his ideas through Socratic dialogues Some of the best-known of these include: The Apology of Socrates, a defense of Socrates written by Plato and presented as if it was a speech he had given at the trial, Phaedo, a fictional discussion between Socrates and his disciples on the nature of the soul, set immediately before his execution; The Symposium, a series of speeches given by Socrates, Aristophanes, and other famous Athenians on the nature of Eros; and The Republic, widely regarded as Plato's most important work, a long dialogue describing the ideal government.

Aristotle was a student at Plato's Academy who later went on to found his own school in Athens, the Lyceum. From the body of writings that have come down to us in his name, the enormous range of his interests is evident: the extant treatises cover logic, the physical and biological sciences, ethics, politics, and constitutional government. Among Aristotle's most notable works are Politics, Nicomachean Ethics, Poetics, On the Soul, and Rhetoric.

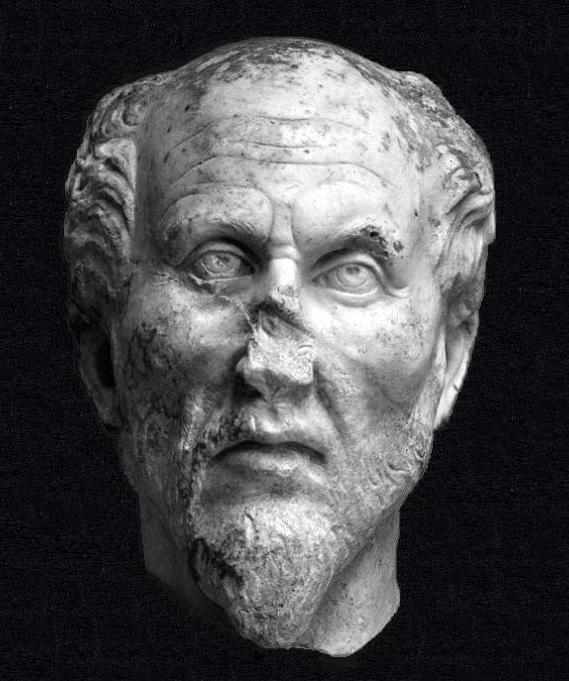
Head of Plotinus, a major philosopher from the Roman Era

Plotinus transformed Plato's philosophy into a school called Neoplatonism. His Enneads had a wide-ranging influence on European thought until at least the seventeenth century. Plotinus's philosophy mainly revolved around the concepts of nous, psyche, and the "One".

== Prose fiction ==
Very little has survived of prose fiction from the Hellenistic Era, the Roman Period was the time when the majority of extant works of Greek prose fiction were composed. The Milesiaka by Aristides of Miletos was probably written during the second century BC. The Milesiaka itself has not survived to the present day in its complete form, but various references to it have survived. The book established a whole new genre of so-called "Milesian tales".

The ancient Greek novels Chaereas and Callirhoe by Chariton and Metiochus and Parthenope were probably both written during the late first century BC or early first century AD, during the latter part of the Hellenistic Era. The discovery of several fragments of Lollianos's Phoenician Tale reveal the existence of a genre of ancient Greek picaresque novel.

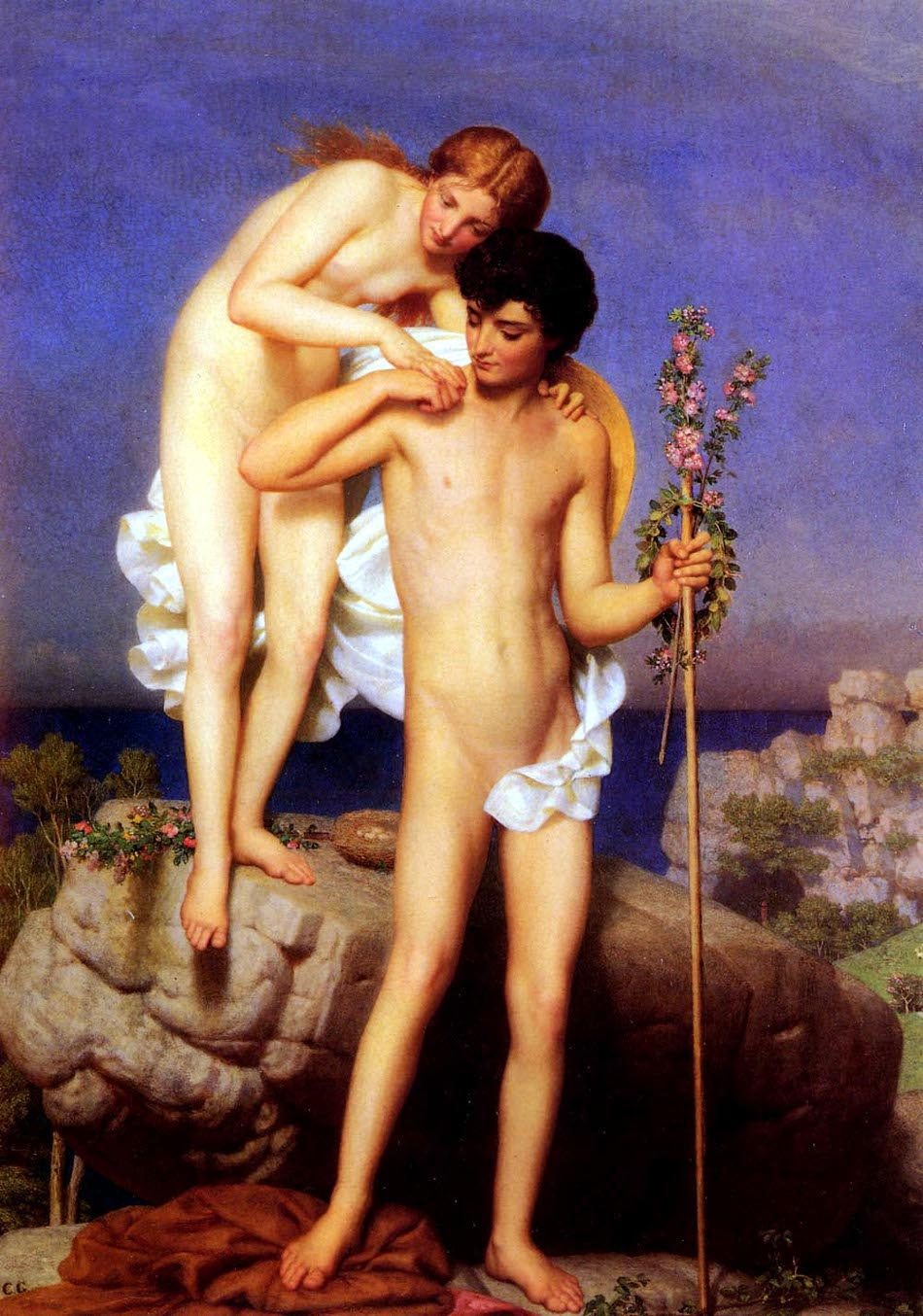
A nineteenth-century painting by the Swiss-French painter Marc Gabriel Charles Gleyre depicting a scene from Daphnis and Chloe

The ancient Greek novels Leucippe and Clitophon by Achilles Tatius and Daphnis and Chloe by Longus were both probably written during the early second century AD. Daphnis and Chloe, by far the most famous of the five surviving ancient Greek romance novels, is a nostalgic tale of two young lovers growing up in an idealized pastoral environment on the Greek island of Lesbos. The Wonders Beyond Thule by Antonius Diogenes may have also been written during the early second century AD, although scholars are unsure of its exact date. The Wonders Beyond Thule has not survived in its complete form, but a very lengthy summary of it written by Photios I of Constantinople has survived. The Ephesian Tale by Xenophon of Ephesus was probably written during the late second century AD.

Illustration from 1894 by William Strang depicting a battle scene from Book One of Lucian of Samosata's A True Story

The satirist Lucian of Samosata lived during the late second century AD. Lucian's works were incredibly popular during antiquity. Over eighty different writings attributed to Lucian have survived to the present day. Almost all of Lucian's works are written in the heavily Atticized dialect of ancient Greek language prevalent among the well-educated at the time. His book The Syrian Goddess, however, was written in a faux-Ionic dialect, deliberately imitating the dialect and style of Herodotus. Lucian's most famous work is the novel A True Story, which some authors have described as the earliest surviving work of science fiction. His dialogue The Lover of Lies contains several of the earliest known ghost stories as well as the earliest known version of "The Sorcerer's Apprentice". His letter The Passing of Peregrinus, a ruthless satire against Christians, contains one of the earliest pagan appraisals of early Christianity.

The Aethiopica by Heliodorus of Emesa was probably written during the third century AD. It tells the story of a young Ethiopian princess named Chariclea, who is estranged from her family and goes on many misadventures across the known world. Of all the ancient Greek novels, the one that attained the greatest level of popularity was the Alexander Romance, a fictionalized account of the exploits of Alexander the Great written in the third century AD. Eighty versions of it have survived in twenty-four different languages, attesting that, during the Middle Ages, the novel was nearly as popular as the Bible. Versions of the Alexander Romance were so commonplace in the fourteenth century that Geoffrey Chaucer wrote that "...every wight that hath discrecioun / Hath herd somwhat or al of [Alexander's] fortune."

== Science and mathematics ==
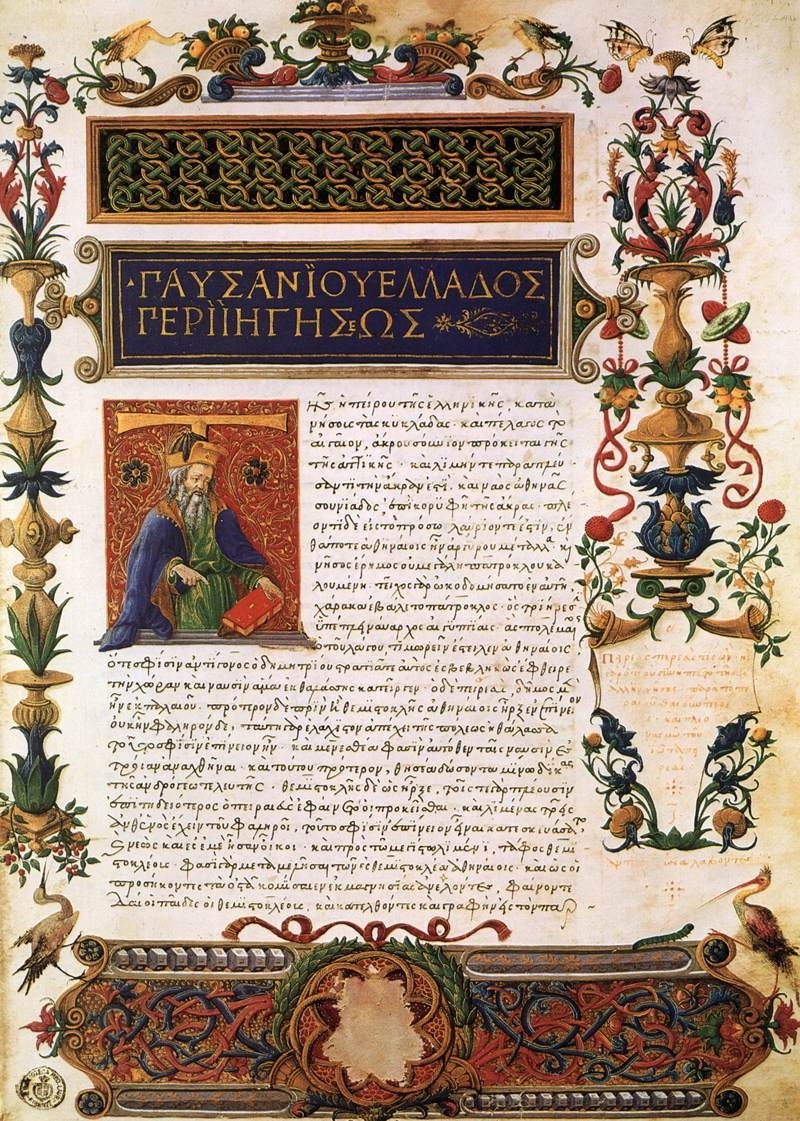
Manuscript (1485), of Pausanias's Description of Greece at the Laurentian Library

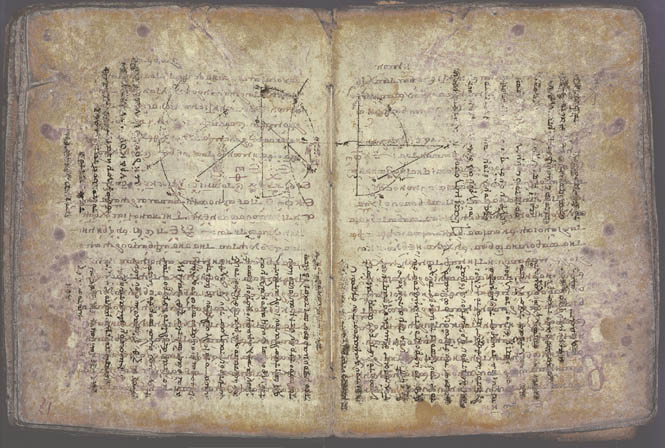
In 1906, The Archimedes Palimpsest revealed works by Archimedes previously thought to have been lost.

Eratosthenes of Alexandria (c. 276 BC – c. 195/194 BC), wrote on astronomy and geography, but his work is known mainly from later summaries. He is credited with being the first person to measure the Earth's circumference. Much that was written by the mathematicians Euclid and Archimedes has been preserved. Euclid is known for his Elements, a treatise that has exerted a continuing influence on mathematics. From Archimedes several treatises have come down to the present. Among them are Measurement of the Circle, in which he worked out the value of pi; The Method of Mechanical Theorems, on his work in mechanics; The Sand Reckoner; and On Floating Bodies.

The physician Galen lived during the 2nd century AD. He was a careful student of anatomy, and his works exerted a powerful influence on medicine for the next 1,400 years. Strabo, who died about AD 23, was a geographer and historian. His Historical Sketches in 47 volumes has nearly all been lost. His Geographical Sketches remains the only existing ancient book covering the whole range of people and countries known to the Greeks and Romans through the time of Augustus. Pausanias, who lived in the 2nd century AD, was also a geographer. His Description of Greece is a travel guide describing the geography and mythic history of Greece during the second century. The book takes the form of a tour of Greece, starting in Athens and ending in Naupactus.

The scientist of the Roman period who had the greatest influence on later generations was undoubtedly the astronomer Ptolemy. He lived during the 2nd century AD, though little is known of his life. His masterpiece, originally entitled The Mathematical Collection, has come to the present under the title Almagest, as it was translated by Arab astronomers with that title. It was Ptolemy who devised a detailed description of an Earth-centered universe, a notion that dominated astronomical thinking for more than 1,300 years. The Ptolemaic view of the universe endured until Copernicus, Galileo, Kepler, and other early modern astronomers replaced it with heliocentrism.

== Christian literature ==
The New Testament, written by various authors in varying qualities of Koine Greek also hails from this period, the most important works being the Gospels and the Epistles of Saint Paul.

Early Christian philosophers including Justin Martyr and Origen of Alexandria also made extensive use of ideas from Greek philosophy, especially Platonism.

== Legacy ==
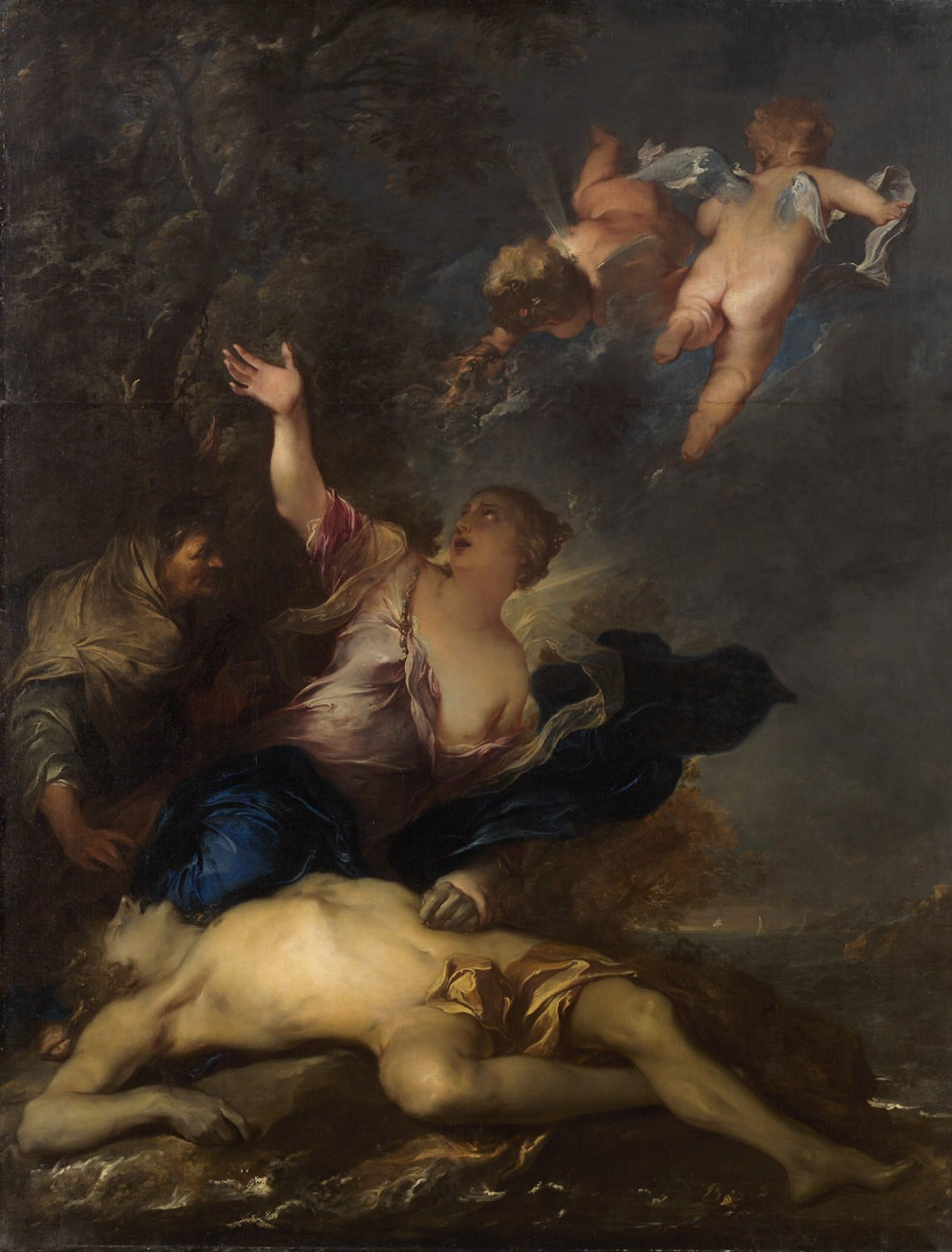
Hero Mourns the Dead Leander by Gillis Backereel (1640s)

Ancient Greek literature has had an enormous impact on western literature as a whole. Ancient Roman authors adopted various styles and motifs from ancient Greek literature. These ideas were later, in turn, adopted by other western European writers and literary critics.

=== Ancient ===
Ancient Roman writers were acutely aware of the ancient Greek literary legacy and many deliberately emulated the style and formula of Greek classics in their own works. The Roman poet Vergil, for instance, modeled his epic poem the Aeneid on the Iliad and the Odyssey.

Ancient Greek literature especially influenced later Greek literature. For instance, the Greek novels influenced the later work Hero and Leander, written by Musaeus Grammaticus.

=== Medieval and Renaissance ===
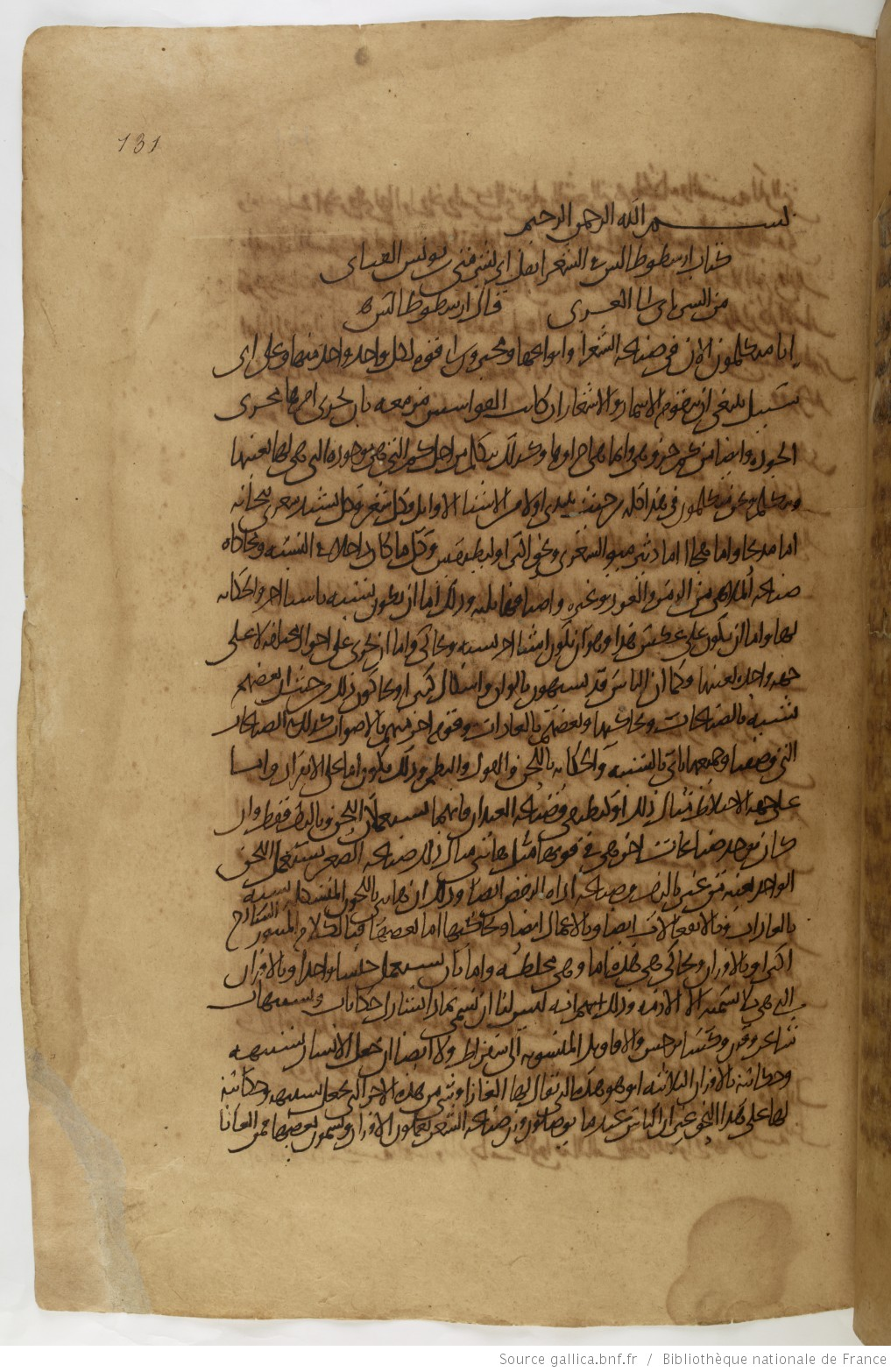
Page from an Arabic translation of Aristotle's Poetics by Abū Bishr Mattā

During the Middle Ages, ancient Greek literature was largely forgotten in Western Europe; The medieval writer Roger Bacon wrote that "there are not four men in Latin Christendom who are acquainted with the Greek, Hebrew, and Arabic grammars."

A Latin translation of an Arabic version of the Poetics by Averroes was available during the Middle Ages.

Numerous figures from classical literature and mythology appear throughout The Divine Comedy by Dante Alighieri.

It was not until the Renaissance that Greek writings were rediscovered by western European scholars. During the Renaissance, Greek began to be taught in western European colleges and universities for the first time, which resulted in western European scholars rediscovering the literature of ancient Greece. The Textus Receptus, the first New Testament printed in the original Greek, was published in 1516 by the Dutch humanist scholar Desiderius Erasmus. Erasmus also published Latin translations of classical Greek texts, including a Latin translation of Hesiod's Works and Days.

Plutarch's Lives were a major influence on William Shakespeare and served as the main source behind his tragedies Julius Caesar, Antony and Cleopatra, and Coriolanus. Shakespeare's comedies A Comedy of Errors and The Twelfth Night drew heavily on themes from Graeco-Roman New Comedy. Meanwhile, Shakespeare's tragedy Timon of Athens was inspired by a story written by Lucian and his comedy Pericles, Prince of Tyre was based on an adaptation of the ancient Greek novel Apollonius of Tyre found in John Gower's Confessio Amantis.

=== Modern ===
The influence of classical Greek literature on modern literature is also evident. The common European terminology about literary genres is directly derived from the ancient Greek terminology.

John Milton's epic poem Paradise Lost is written using a similar style to the two Homeric epics. It also makes frequent allusions to figures from classical literature and mythology, using them as symbols to convey a Christian message.

Lucian's A True Story was part of the inspiration for Jonathan Swift's novel Gulliver's Travels.

Bulfinch's Mythology, a book on Greek mythology published in 1867 and aimed at a popular audience, was described by Carl J. Richard as "one of the most popular books ever published in the United States".

George Bernard Shaw's play Pygmalion is a modern, rationalized retelling of the ancient Greek legend of Pygmalion.

James Joyce's novel Ulysses is a retelling of Homer's Odyssey set in modern-day Dublin.

The mid-twentieth-century British author Mary Renault wrote a number of critically acclaimed novels inspired by ancient Greek literature and mythology, including The Last of the Wine and The King Must Die.

The ideas expressed in Aristotle's Poetics have influenced generations of Western writers and literary critics.

== Papyrus evidence ==
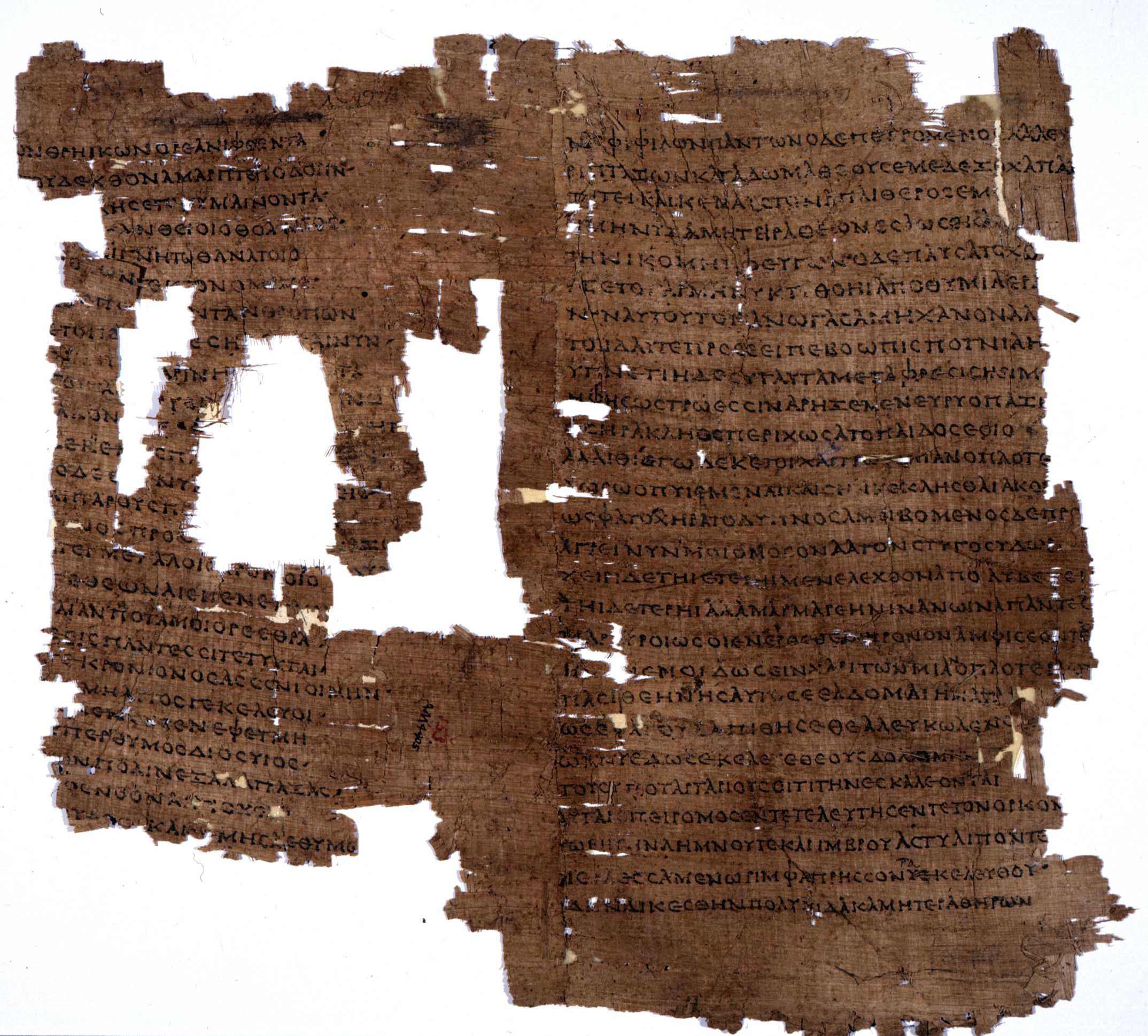
Papyrus Oxyrhynchus 551, a fragment of Homer's Iliad

Literary papyri represent only a small proportion of surviving papyri. At Oxyrhynchus, only about 10% of the papyri are literary texts, while the majority consist of everyday documents such as letters, receipts, and official records.

Approximately 40% of all literary papyri are fragments of Homer's works. In the William Hailey Willis's 1968 survey of Egyptian literary papyri, Homer's works constitute 657 fragments. This far exceeded other classical authors: Demosthenes had 83 fragments, while Euripides and Hesiod had 75 and 74 fragments respectively. Willis documented 26 authors with more than 5 fragments each, 48 authors with 2-4 fragments, and 70 authors represented by just a single fragment. As of 2024, the distribution remains similar, with Homer's works appearing in 1680 fragments, Demosthenes in 204 fragments, and Euripides in 170 papyri.

The dominance of Homer in papyrus findings has been consistently documented over decades. Pack's 1965 inventory counted 681 Homeric papyri, compared to approximately 80 each for Euripides and Demosthenes. By 1983, Paul Mertens identified 1004 Homeric papyri, compared to 111 for Euripides and 105 for Demosthenes, showing an increase from about 600 to about 900 fragments.

A significant number of papyri belong to the category of "Homerica" – exegetical texts, commentaries, reading aids, and scholarly materials related to Homer. Of the 681 Homeric papyri in Pack's inventory, 605 were poetry fragments while 76 were Homerica. In Mertens' updated inventory of 1004 items, 864 contained poetry and 140 were Homerica – showing an 84% increase in Homerica compared to a 42% increase in poetry fragments, suggesting growing scholarly engagement with Homeric texts.

Ancient Greek tragedy represents a significant category of literature preserved in fragments. While approximately 300 Ancient Greek tragedies are known, only 32 complete texts have survived to the present day in full. The remainder exist only in fragments of varying length. All the fully preserved tragedies were written by just three authors: Aeschylus, Euripides, and Sophocles.

== See also ==
- Late antique literature
- Syriac literature
