= Papyrus Oxyrhynchus 109 =

Ancient Greek manuscript

Papyrus Oxyrhynchus 109 (P. Oxy. 109 or P. Oxy. I 109) is a list of personal property, written in Greek and discovered in Oxyrhynchus. The manuscript was written on papyrus in the form of a sheet. The document was written in the late 3rd or 4th century. Currently it is housed in the Houghton Library (SM. Inv. 2214) at Harvard University in Cambridge.

== Description ==
The document contains a list of personal effects, chiefly clothes. Several of the words recur in Papyrus Oxyrhynchus 114. The measurements of the fragment are 240 by 102 millimetres (9.4 by 4.0 in).

It was discovered by Grenfell and Hunt in 1897 in Oxyrhynchus. The text was published by Grenfell and Hunt in 1898.

== Text ==
List of effects.

1 white garment of pure wool

2 white vests

2 undyed do.

1 purple do.

2 white veils

1 undyed do.

2 linen cloths from Tarsus (?)

2 shawls

2 tunics with a broad purple border

2 girdles

2 cloaks

2 shirts

3 cushions

3 pillows

2 mattresses

a woollen (?) tunic and veil

1 white tunic

1 new cover

3 bronze vessels

1 small vessel (?)

2 bronze kettles

1 gown

(Sent?) to the Oxyrhynchite nome:

1 band

2 chemises

20 minae of silver

== See also ==
- Oxyrhynchus Papyri
- Papyrus Oxyrhynchus 108
- Papyrus Oxyrhynchus 110
- Papyrus Oxyrhynchus 114
