= Papyrus Oxyrhynchus 103 =

Greek manuscript (land lease)

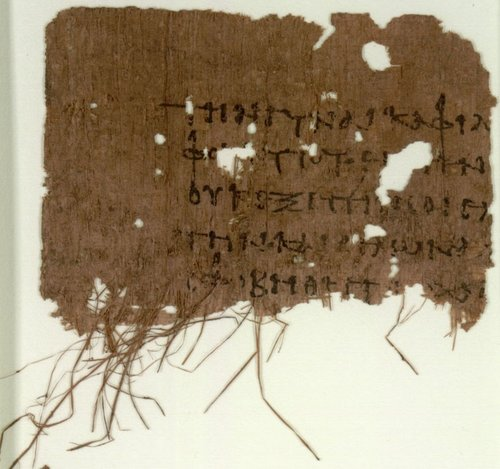
Papyrus Oxyrhynchus 103

Papyrus Oxyrhynchus 103 (P. Oxy. 103 or P. Oxy. I 103) is a lease of some land, written in Greek and discovered in Oxyrhynchus. The manuscript was written on a sheet of papyrus. The document was written on 13 October 316. Currently it is housed in the British Library (767) in London.

== Description ==
The document is a contract to lease one aroura of land near the village of Isionpanga. The owner of the land was Aurelius Themistocles, gymnasiarch and prytanis of Oxyrhynchus. The lessees were Aurelius Leonidas and Aurelius Dioscorus. The land was to be sown with flax and the crop to be equally divided between landlord and tenant. The dating in this document by the years of the Roman emperors is important, as it places the elevation of Licinius after 28 August 308. Some ancient historians had placed his elevation in 307, and this document provides evidence that 308 is in fact the correct year. The fragment's size is 260 by 160 mm.

It was discovered by Grenfell and Hunt in 1897 in Oxyrhynchus. They published the text in 1898.

== See also ==
- Oxyrhynchus Papyri
- Papyrus Oxyrhynchus 102
- Papyrus Oxyrhynchus 104
