= Papyrus Oxyrhynchus 277 =

Greek papyrus fragment

Papyrus Oxyrhynchus 277 (P. Oxy. 277 or P. Oxy. II 277) is a fragment of a Lease of Land, in Greek. It was discovered in Oxyrhynchus. The manuscript was written on papyrus in the form of a sheet. It is dated to 6 September 19 BC. Currently it is housed in the British Library (Department of Manuscripts, 1188) in London.

== Description ==
The document was written by Dionysius and Artemidorus. Lease of 36 3/4 arourae of land near the village of Pamis by Dionysius to Artemidorus for one year. The land was to be sown with corn, and the produce to be shared equally between landlord and tenant, the division being apparently made at the village granary at the end of the year. The cost of transport and the instruments for mowing were to be provided by the tenant, those for harvesting jointly by both parties. An allowance was made to the tenant for land-taxes.

The measurements of the fragment are 290 by 166 mm.

It was discovered by Grenfell and Hunt in 1897 in Oxyrhynchus. The text was published by Grenfell and Hunt in 1899.

== See also ==
- Oxyrhynchus Papyri
