= Papyrus Oxyrhynchus 273 =

Greek papyrus fragment

Papyrus Oxyrhynchus 273 (P. Oxy. 273 or P. Oxy. II 273) is a fragment of a Cession of Land, in Greek. It was discovered in Oxyrhynchus. The manuscript was written on papyrus in the form of a sheet and is dated to 24 June 95. Currently, it is housed in the Royal Museums of Fine Arts of Belgium (Fondation Egyptologique Reine Elisabeth, E 5946) in Brussels.

== Description ==
The document is an agreement between Julia Heracla and Theon, who is the son of Nicipus. By the terms of this document, Julia cedes it to her daughter Gaia, as a gift, five arourae of catoecic land.

The measurements of the fragment are 138 by 117 mm. The document is mutilated.

It was discovered by Grenfell and Hunt in 1897 in Oxyrhynchus. The text was published by Grenfell and Hunt in 1899.

== See also ==
- Oxyrhynchus Papyri
