= Papyrus Oxyrhynchus 279 =

Greek papyrus fragment

Papyrus Oxyrhynchus 279 (P. Oxy. 279 or P. Oxy. II 279) is a fragment of a Lease of Domain Land, in Greek. It was discovered in Oxyrhynchus. The manuscript was written on papyrus in the form of a sheet. It is dated between years 44-45. Currently it is housed in the Cambridge University Library (Add. Ms. 4055) in Cambridge.

== Description ==
The document was written by Theogenes. Application addressed to a βασιλικος γραμματευς by Theogenes, who was 'desirous of securing a gain to the treasury,' for the right of cultivating 40 arourae of domain land (βασιλικη γη) near Nesla at a higher rent than that paid by the present cultivators. The details of the rent are obscure owing to the lacunae.

The measurements of the fragment are 344 by 119 mm. The document is mutilated.

It was discovered by Grenfell and Hunt in 1897 in Oxyrhynchus. The text was published by Grenfell and Hunt in 1899.

== See also ==
- Oxyrhynchus Papyri
