= Papyrus Oxyrhynchus 102 =

Greek manuscript (land lease)

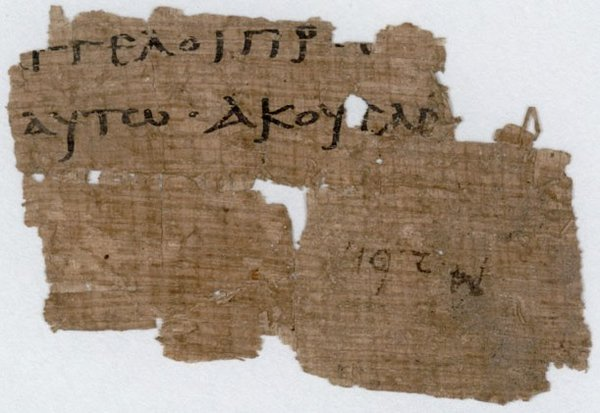
Papyrus Oxyrhynchus 102

Papyrus Oxyrhynchus 102 (P. Oxy. 102 or P. Oxy. I 102) is a lease of land, written in Greek and discovered in Oxyrhynchus. The manuscript was written on papyrus in the form of a sheet. The document was written 13 October 306. Currently it is housed in the British Library (766) in London.

== Description ==
The document is a lease of 9 arourae of land, near the village of Sestoplelo in the middle toparchy. The land was owned by Aurelia Antiochia and leased to Aurelius Dioscorus for one year. The land was to be sown with flax. The rent was 1 talent and 3,500 drachmae for the year. Although the papyrus was written on 6 October 306, it mentions the fifteenth year of the reign of Constantius I, which he did not attain, having died in July of that year. Grenfell and Hunt speculate that the scribe was unaware of the emperor's death. The measurements of the fragment are 250 by 140 mm.

It was discovered by Grenfell and Hunt in 1897 in Oxyrhynchus. The text was published by Grenfell and Hunt in 1898.

== See also ==
- Oxyrhynchus Papyri
- Papyrus Oxyrhynchus 101
- Papyrus Oxyrhynchus 103
