= Papyrus Oxyrhynchus 280 =

Greek papyrus fragment

Papyrus Oxyrhynchus 280 (P. Oxy. 280 or P. Oxy. II 280) is a fragment of a Lease of Land, in Greek. It was discovered in Oxyrhynchus. The manuscript was written on papyrus in the form of a sheet. It is dated between years 88–89. As of 2013 it is housed in the Cambridge University Library (Add. Ms. 4056) in Cambridge.

== Description ==
The document was written by Dionysius. It is a lease of 5 arourae of land for four years from Dionysius, son of Dionysius, to Dionysius, son of Harpocration, at the rent of 17 bushels of wheat. For the first three years any crops might he sown with wheat, half with beans. In the event of a failure of the inundation in any of the years, that year was not to be counted in the lease.

The measurements of the fragment are 145 by 103 mm (5.7 by 4.1 in). The document is mutilated.

It was discovered by Grenfell and Hunt in 1897 in Oxyrhynchus. The text was published by Grenfell and Hunt in 1899.

== See also ==
- Oxyrhynchus Papyri
