= Papyrus Oxyrhynchus 98 =

Greek manuscript

Papyrus Oxyrhynchus 98 (P. Oxy. 98 or P. Oxy. I 98) is a letter acknowledging the repayment of a loan, written in Greek. It was discovered in Oxyrhynchus. The manuscript was written on papyrus in the form of a sheet. It is dated to between 141 and 142 (the fifth year of Antoninus Pius). Currently it is housed in the British Library (764) in London. It is also known as P. Lond. III 764.

== Description ==
The document was written by Chaeremon, son of Theon, and Nicanor, who had received 168 drachmae from Archias. This was the balance due on a loan of 700 drachmae made by Chaeremon four years before. The measurements of the fragment are 115 by 100 mm.

It was discovered by Grenfell and Hunt in 1897 in Oxyrhynchus. The text was published by Grenfell and Hunt in 1898. The fragment was also examined by Frederic G. Kenyon (1907).

== See also ==
- Oxyrhynchus Papyri
- Papyrus Oxyrhynchus 97
- Papyrus Oxyrhynchus 99
