= Papyrus Oxyrhynchus 104 =

Greek will manuscript written in 96

Papyrus Oxyrhynchus 104 (P. Oxy. 104 or P. Oxy. I 104) is a will, written in Greek and discovered in Oxyrhynchus. The manuscript was written on papyrus in the form of a sheet. The document was written on 26 December 96. It is currently housed in the Cambridge University Library (MS Add.4042).

== Description ==
The document contains the will of Soëris, daughter of Harpocras, executed in the 16th year of Domitian. She leaves her house and its contents to her son Areotes or his heirs, with the condition that her husband Atreus be allowed to live in it and to receive from Areotes 48 drachmae per year until the payments reach a total of 300 drachmae. Soëris owed this money to Atreus. On the death of Atreus, Areotes was to pay 40 drachmae to his sister Tnepheros and to provide a home for her in the event of a separation from her husband. The measurements of the fragment are 170 by 163 mm.

It was discovered by Grenfell and Hunt in 1897 in Oxyrhynchus. The text was published by Grenfell and Hunt in 1898.

== See also ==
- Oxyrhynchus Papyri
- Papyrus Oxyrhynchus 103
- Papyrus Oxyrhynchus 105
