= Papyrus Oxyrhynchus 116 =

Ancient Greek papyrus personal letter

Papyrus Oxyrhynchus 116 (P. Oxy. 116 or P. Oxy. I 116) is a personal letter, written in Greek and discovered in Oxyrhynchus. The manuscript was written on papyrus in the form of a sheet. The document was written in the 2nd century. Currently it is housed in the Percival Library at Clifton College in Bristol, England.

== Description ==
The recto side of the document contains another letter from Irene to Taonnophris and Philo (see P. Oxy. 115). The verso side contains the address "to Taonnophris and Philo." The measurements of the fragment are 132 by 74 mm.

It was discovered by Grenfell and Hunt in 1897 in Oxyrhynchus. The text was published by Grenfell and Hunt in 1898.

== Text ==
Irene to Taonnophris and Philo. I have given to Calocaerus for Dionysius 340 drachmae, as he wrote to me to give him whatever he wanted. So please give this money to our workman Parammon, and if he requires anything further give him whatever he wants and send him off quickly. I send you by Calocaerus in my portmanteau a measure of dates from Ombos (Note: There were several cities in Ancient Egypt called Ombos, and it is unclear which this one was.) and twenty-five pomegranates, under seal. Please send me back in it two drachmas' weight of purgative, of which I am in urgent need. I send you by the said Calocaerus a box of grapes...and a basket of good dates under seal. Farewell. Athyr 30.

== See also ==
- Oxyrhynchus Papyri
- Papyrus Oxyrhynchus 115
- Papyrus Oxyrhynchus 117
