= Papyrus Oxyrhynchus 110 =

2nd century manuscript

Papyrus Oxyrhynchus 110 (P. Oxy. 110 or P. Oxy. I 110) is an invitation to dinner, written in Greek and discovered in Oxyrhynchus. The manuscript was written on papyrus in the form of a sheet. The document was written in the 2nd century. Currently it is housed at Eton College in Eton, Berkshire.

== Description ==
The document is a formal invitation from Chaeremon to an unnamed person to a dinner at the serapeum. The measurements of the fragment are 44 by 63 mm.

It was discovered by Grenfell and Hunt in 1897 in Oxyrhynchus. The text was published by Grenfell and Hunt in 1898.

== Text ==
Ἐρωτᾷ σε Χαιρήμων δειπνῆσαι εἰς κλείνην τοῦ κυρίου Σαράπιδος ἐν τῷ Σαραπείῳ αὔριον, ἥτις ἐστὶν ιε, ἀπὸ ὥρας θ.
Erōtâi se Khairḗmōn deipnêsai eis kleínēn toû kuríou Sarápidos en tôi Sarapeíōi aúrion, hḗtis estìn ie, apò hṓras th.
Chaeremon requests your company at dinner at the table of the lord Sarapis in the serapeum tomorrow, the 15th, at 9 o'clock.

== See also ==
- Oxyrhynchus Papyri
- Papyrus Oxyrhynchus 109
- Papyrus Oxyrhynchus 111
