= Papyrus Oxyrhynchus 123 =

Greek papyrus fragment

Papyrus Oxyrhynchus 123 (P. Oxy. 123 or P. Oxy. I 123) is a letter from a notary to his son, written in Greek and discovered in Oxyrhynchus. The manuscript was written on papyrus in the form of a sheet. The document was written in the 3rd or 4th century. Currently it is housed in the Egyptian Museum (10014) in Cairo, Egypt.

== Description ==
The document is a letter from Ischurion, a tabularius, to his son Dionysotheon, asking him to pressure Timotheus to attend an official function of some sort. The measurements of the fragment are 240 by 150 mm.

It was discovered by Grenfell and Hunt in 1897 in Oxyrhynchus. The text was published by Grenfell and Hunt in 1898.

== See also ==
- Oxyrhynchus Papyri
- Papyrus Oxyrhynchus 122
- Papyrus Oxyrhynchus 124
