= Papyrus Oxyrhynchus 120 =

4th century Greek manuscript

Papyrus Oxyrhynchus 120 (P. Oxy. 120 or P. Oxy. I 120) contains two letters, written in Greek and discovered in Oxyrhynchus. The manuscript was written on papyrus in the form of a sheet. The document was written in the 4th century. Currently it is housed at Haileybury College in Hertford Heath.

== Description ==
This papyrus contains two letters, one on the recto side and the other on the verso. The letter on the recto side is from Hermias to his sister, asking for help. The note on the verso side is from Hermias to his son, Gunthus, asking him to come at once. The measurements of the fragment are 275 by 128 mm.

It was discovered by Grenfell and Hunt in 1897 in Oxyrhynchus. The text was published by Grenfell and Hunt in 1898.

== Text ==
=== Recto ===
Hermias to his sister, greeting. What remains to write to you about I do not know, for I have told you of everything till I am tired, and yet you pay no attention. When a man finds himself in adversity he ought to give way and not fight stubbornly against fate. We fail to realize the inferiority and wretchedness to which we are born. Well, so far nothing at all has been done; make it your business to send some one to me, either Gunthus or Ammonius, to stay with me until I know the position of my affairs. Am I to be distracted and oppressed until Heaven takes pity on me? Hermias is anxious to come to you. I requested him to stay, but he refused, saying that he had pressing business and that he must go, and that his son Gennadius was unable to attend to the property, especially as he was a stranger to the place and was engaged at his post. See that matters are properly conducted on your own part, or our disasters will be complete. We are resolved not to continue in misfortune (?). Farewell; I wish you all prosperity.

=== Verso ===
Hermias to his son Gunthus, greeting. Unless Ammonius comes to me at once, put off everything or let him do your work and come yourself. Whatever you do, do not fail me in my trouble. Let me know how it was with Didymus. Can time accomplish everything after all? I pray for your health.

== See also ==
- Oxyrhynchus Papyri
- Papyrus Oxyrhynchus 119
- Papyrus Oxyrhynchus 121
