= Papyrus Oxyrhynchus 122 =

Egyptian manuscript

Papyrus Oxyrhynchus 122 (P. Oxy. 122 or P. Oxy. I 122) is a letter to a praefect, written in Greek and discovered in Oxyrhynchus. The manuscript was written on papyrus in the form of a sheet. The document was written in the late 3rd or 4th century. Currently it is housed in the British Library (768) in London, England.

== Description ==
The document is a letter to Agenor, a praefect, probably of a legion. It is from Gaianus. The author's high rank is indicated by the fact that he places his own name before that of the praefect, among other things. The probable fact that Gaianus was more accustomed to Latin than Greek is indicated by his handwriting, which is Latin and characterized by the occasional appearance of Latin letter forms. The document is written in a cursive hand, which is remarkable for the use of the rough breathing mark. The measurements of the fragment are 258 by 180 mm.

It was discovered by Grenfell and Hunt in 1897 in Oxyrhynchus. The text was published by Grenfell and Hunt in 1898.

== Text ==
From ...s Gaianus. Greeting, my good brother Agenor! I received at once about the day of the Saturnalia what you despatched to me. I should have sent to you myself more quickly if I had had more soldiers with me; but ... went back and we cannot catch a single animal. I send for your use ...

I pray, my dear brother, for your lasting health and prosperity.

== See also ==
- Oxyrhynchus Papyri
- Papyrus Oxyrhynchus 121
- Papyrus Oxyrhynchus 123
