= Papyrus Oxyrhynchus 105 =

Greek will written between 118 and 137

Papyrus Oxyrhynchus 105 (P. Oxy. 105 or P. Oxy. I 105) is a will, written in Greek and discovered in Oxyrhynchus. The manuscript was written on papyrus in the form of a sheet. The document was written between 118 and 137. Currently it is housed in the Trinity College Library (Pap. C 1) in Dublin.

== Description ==
This document contains the will of Pekusis, son of Hermes and Didyme, along with the signatures of the testator and six witnesses. As is usually the case with wills, the writing is on the vertical fibers of the papyrus, which makes the lines of great length. The measurements of the fragment are 268 by 31 mm.

It was discovered by Grenfell and Hunt in 1897 in Oxyrhynchus. The text was published by Grenfell and Hunt in 1898.

== See also ==
- Oxyrhynchus Papyri
- Papyrus Oxyrhynchus 104
- Papyrus Oxyrhynchus 106
- Papyrology
