= Papyrus Oxyrhynchus 100 =

Ancient Greek manuscript

Papyrus Oxyrhynchus 100 (P. Oxy. 100 or P. Oxy. I 100) is a declaration on oath written in Greek and discovered in Oxyrhynchus. The manuscript was written on papyrus in the form of a sheet. The document was written on 8 April 133. Currently it is housed at the Edinburgh University Library in Edinburgh.

== Description ==
The recto of the document contains a declaration on oath, addressed to the agoranomi. In it, Marcus Antonius Dius announces the sale of four pieces of land in the Cretan and Jewish quarter of Oxyrhynchus to three parties jointly. The price paid was 2200 drachmae. Dius also declares the land to be free of mortgages. The verso of the document contains part of an account. The measurements of the fragment are 273 by 158 mm.

It was discovered by Grenfell and Hunt in 1897 in Oxyrhynchus. The text was published by Grenfell and Hunt in 1898.

== See also ==
- Oxyrhynchus Papyri
- Papyrus Oxyrhynchus 99
- Papyrus Oxyrhynchus 101
