= Papyrus Oxyrhynchus 113 =

Second century Greek manuscript

Papyrus Oxyrhynchus 113 (P. Oxy. 113 or P. Oxy. I 113) is a letter, written in Greek and discovered in Oxyrhynchus. The manuscript was written on papyrus in the form of a sheet. The document was written in the 2nd century. Currently it is housed in the Egyptian Museum (Cat. Gen. 10011) in Cairo, Egypt.

== Description ==
The document is a letter from Corbolon to Heraclides. The measurements of the fragment are 187 by 100 mm. It was discovered by Grenfell and Hunt in 1897 in Oxyrhynchus. The text was published by Grenfell and Hunt in 1898.

== Text ==
Corobolon to Heraclides, greeting. I send you the key by Horion and the piece of the lock by Onnophris, the camel-driver of Apollonius. I enclosed in the former packet a pattern of white-violet color. I beg you to be good enough to match it and buy me two drachmas' weight, and send it to me at once by any messenger you can find, for the tunic is to be woven immediately. I received everything you told me to expect by Onnophris safely. I send you by the same Onnophris six quarts of good apples. I thank all the gods to think that I came upon Plution in the Oxyrhynchite nome. Do not think that I took no trouble about the key. The reason is that the smith is a long way from us. I wonder that you did not see your way to let me have what I asked you to send by Corbolon, especially when I wanted it for a festival. I beg you to buy me a silver seal and to send it me with all speed. Take care that Onnophris buys me what Irene's mother told him. I told him that Syntrophus said that nothing more should be given to Amarantus on my account. Let me know what you have given him that I may settle accounts with him. Otherwise I and my son will come for this purpose. I had the large cheeses from Corbolon. I did not however want large ones, but small. Let me know of anything that you want and I will gladly do it. Farewell. Payni the 1st. (P.S.) Send me an obol's worth of cake for my nephew.

== See also ==
- Oxyrhynchus Papyri
- Papyrus Oxyrhynchus 112
- Papyrus Oxyrhynchus 114
