= Papyrus Oxyrhynchus 112 =

3rd or 4th-century invitation manuscript

Papyrus Oxyrhynchus 112 (P. Oxy. 112 or P. Oxy. I 112) is an invitation to a festival, written in Greek and discovered in Oxyrhynchus. The manuscript was written on papyrus in the form of a sheet. The document was written in the late 3rd or early 4th century. Currently it is housed in the Vaughan Library at the Harrow School in Harrow on the Hill.

== Description ==
The document is an invitation from Petosiris to Serenia to visit in order to attend a festival. The measurements of the fragment are 75 by 85 mm.

It was discovered by Grenfell and Hunt in 1897 in Oxyrhynchus. The text was published by Grenfell and Hunt in 1898.

== Text ==
Greeting, my dear Serenia, from Petosiris. Be sure, dear, to come up on the 20th for the birthday festival of the god, and let me know whether you are coming by boat or by donkey, in order that we may send for you accordingly. Take care not to forget. I pray for your continued health.

== See also ==
- Oxyrhynchus Papyri
- Papyrus Oxyrhynchus 111
- Papyrus Oxyrhynchus 113
