= Papyrus Oxyrhynchus 118 =

Ancient Greek papyrus personal letter

Papyrus Oxyrhynchus 118 (P. Oxy. 118 or P. Oxy. I 118) is a personal letter, written in Greek and discovered in Oxyrhynchus. The manuscript was written on papyrus in the form of a sheet. The document was written in the late 3rd century. Currently it is housed in the Cambridge University Library (4043) at the University of Cambridge.

== Description ==
The verso side of the papyrus contains a letter from Saras and Eudaemon to Diogenes. The recto side is part of an account, partially effaced, in the same hand as the letter on the verso side, although not a part of it. The measurements of the fragment are 329 by 95 mm.

It was discovered by Grenfell and Hunt in 1897 in Oxyrhynchus. The text was published by Grenfell and Hunt in 1898.

== Text ==
Saras and Eudaemon to Diogenes the younger, greeting. We have been advised by the most notable Ammonion to send for a ferry-boat on account of the uncertainty of the road. We accordingly send you this message, in order that, if they consent to send while you are there, you may procure what is necessary, and if not, that you may despatch a report to the strategus and the guardians of the peace. You know what hospitality requires, so get a little ... from the priests and buy some incense and ... We hear that you have been two days at Heracleopolis. Make haste back to look after your charge, when you have obtained what you went for. It is no use if a person comes too late for what required his presence. Ammonas and Dioscorus the cooks have gone to the Oxyrhynchite nome on the understanding that they would return at once. As they are delaying, and might be wanted, please send them off immediately.

== See also ==
- Oxyrhynchus Papyri
- Papyrus Oxyrhynchus 117
- Papyrus Oxyrhynchus 119
