= Papyrus Oxyrhynchus 106 =

Letter written in Greek

Papyrus Oxyrhynchus 106 (P. Oxy. 106 or P. Oxy. I 106) is a letter containing the revocation of a will. It was written in Greek and discovered in Oxyrhynchus. The manuscript was written on papyrus in the form of a sheet. The document was written on 20 April 135. Currently it is housed in the Haskell Oriental Institute (7065) at the University of Chicago.

== Description ==
The document is a letter addressed to the agoranomi (magistrates), from Apollonius, one of their assistants. He states that in accordance with the instructions of the strategus, he had returned the revoked will of Ptolema, which she had dictated and deposited in their archives 30 years previously. The measurements of the fragment are 305 by 81 mm.

It was discovered by Grenfell and Hunt in 1897 in Oxyrhynchus. The text was published by Grenfell and Hunt in 1898.

== See also ==
- Oxyrhynchus Papyri
- Papyrus Oxyrhynchus 105
- Papyrus Oxyrhynchus 107
