= Papyrus Oxyrhynchus 107 =

Greek papyrus fragment

Papyrus Oxyrhynchus 107 (P. Oxy. 107 or P. Oxy. I 107) is an acknowledgement of receipt of a will, sent in regard to its revocation. It is written in Greek and was discovered in Oxyrhynchus. The manuscript was written on papyrus in the form of a sheet. The document was written on 27 February 123. Currently it is housed in the Egyptian Museum (Cat. Gen. 10006) in Cairo.

== Description ==
The document consists of an acknowledgement, addressed to Horion, clerk of the agoranomeion (ἀγορανομεῖον), of the receipt of a will made ten years before, which the testator now wished to revoke. The measurements of the fragment are 338 by 130 mm.

It was discovered by Grenfell and Hunt in 1897 in Oxyrhynchus. The text was published by Grenfell and Hunt in 1898.

== See also ==
- Oxyrhynchus Papyri
- Papyrus Oxyrhynchus 106
- Papyrus Oxyrhynchus 108
