= Papyrus Oxyrhynchus 108 =

Egyptian manuscript

Papyrus Oxyrhynchus 108 (P. Oxy. 108 or P. Oxy. I 108) is the monthly meat bill of a cook, written in Greek and discovered in Oxyrhynchus. The manuscript was written on papyrus in the form of a sheet. The document was written on 28 September in either 183 or 215. Currently it is housed at the University of Pennsylvania Museum of Archaeology and Anthropology (E2753) in Philadelphia.

== Description ==
The manuscript is dated to the 24th year of an emperor, more probably Caracalla than Commodus. If Caracalla is meant it would date the papyrus to 215 rather than 183. It contains a list in two columns of the different kinds of meat supplied to the cook during the month of Thoth and part of the preceding month. The measurements of the fragment are 153 by 125 mm.

It was discovered by Grenfell and Hunt in 1897 in Oxyrhynchus. The text was published by Grenfell and Hunt in 1898.

== Text ==
Cook's account.

Thoth 4th, 24th year, 4 pounds of meat, 2 trotters (ἄκρα), 1 tongue, 1 snout.

6th, half a head with the tongue (?)

11th, 2 pounds of meat, 1 tongue, 2 kidneys.

12th 1 pound of meat, 1 breast.

14th, 2 pounds of meat, 1 breast.

16th, 3 pounds of meat.

17th, 2 pounds of meat, 1 tongue.

18th, 1 tongue.

21st, 1 paunch.

22nd, 1 paunch, 2 kidneys.

23rd, 2 pounds of meat, 1 paunch, 2 trotters.

26th, 1 tongue.

30th, 1 breast.

And before this on Mesore 18th, 2 pounds of meat, 1 paunch, 2 kidneys.

21st, 1 breast.

23rd, 1 half a head with the tongue, 2 kidneys.

24th, 2 pounds, 2 kidneys.

25th, for Tryphon 2 pounds, 1 ear, 1 trotter, 2 kidneys.

29th, 2 pounds, 2 trotters, 1 tongue.

2nd intercalary day, 1 tongue.

3rd, 1 breast.

== See also ==
- Oxyrhynchus Papyri
- Papyrus Oxyrhynchus 107
- Papyrus Oxyrhynchus 109
