= Papyrus Oxyrhynchus 97 =

Ancient Greek manuscript

Papyrus Oxyrhynchus 97 (P. Oxy. 97 or P. Oxy. I 97) is a power of attorney, agreed on between two brothers. It is written in Greek, and was discovered in Oxyrhynchus. The manuscript was written on papyrus in the form of a sheet. The document was written between January–February of the year 116. Currently it is housed in the Edinburgh University Library (shelf number unknown) in Edinburgh.

== Description ==
Two brothers, Diogenes and Nicanor, had been engaged in a lawsuit with Menestheus, son of Horus, about the ownership of a slave called either Thaisous or Thaësis. The case had come before the strategus of the nome, who then referred it to the praefect. In the agreement, the older brother, Diogenes, agrees that the younger, Nicanor, should attend court and have full power to act as his brother's representative. It was signed by both of them. The measurements of the fragment are 150 by 116 mm.

It was discovered by Grenfell and Hunt in 1897 in Oxyrhynchus. The text was published by Grenfell and Hunt in 1898. The fragment was also examined by Ludwig Mitteis (Chrest. Mitt. 347, 1912).

== See also ==
- Oxyrhynchus Papyri
- Papyrus Oxyrhynchus 96
- Papyrus Oxyrhynchus 98
