= Papyrus Oxyrhynchus 111 =

3rd-century invitation manuscript

Papyrus Oxyrhynchus 111 (P. Oxy. 111 or P. Oxy. I 111) is an invitation to a wedding feast, written in Greek and discovered in Oxyrhynchus. The manuscript was written on papyrus in the form of a sheet. The document was written in the 3rd century. Currently it is housed in the Percival Library at Clifton College in Bristol, England.

== Description ==
The document is a formal invitation to a dinner celebrating a marriage. As in Papyrus Oxyrhynchus 110, the name of the invited guest is not given. The measurements of the fragment are 40 by 80 mm.

It was discovered by Grenfell and Hunt in 1897 in Oxyrhynchus. The text was published by Grenfell and Hunt in 1898.

== Text ==
Herais requests your company at dinner in celebration of the marriage of her children at her house tomorrow, the 5th, at 9 o'clock.

== See also ==
- Oxyrhynchus Papyri
- Papyrus Oxyrhynchus 110
- Papyrus Oxyrhynchus 112
