= Papyrus Oxyrhynchus 121 =

3rd Century historical artifact

Papyrus Oxyrhynchus 121 (P. Oxy. 121 or P. Oxy. I 121) is a letter, written in Greek and discovered in Oxyrhynchus. The manuscript was written on papyrus in the form of a sheet. The document was written in the 3rd century. Currently it is housed in the Haskell Oriental Institute (2067) at the University of Chicago.

== Description ==
The manuscript is a letter from Isidorus to his brother Aurelius. The measurements of the fragment are 166 by 43 mm.

It was discovered by Grenfell and Hunt in 1897 in Oxyrhynchus. The text was published by Grenfell and Hunt in 1898.

== Text ==
Isidorus to his brother Aurelius, many greetings. I told you about the two acanthus trees, that they were to give them to us; let them be dug round today. Let Phanias himself have them dug round. If he refuses, write to let me know. I shall perhaps come tomorrow for the sealing; so make haste with this in order that I may know. As to the bulls, make them work; don't allow them to be entirely idle. Carry all the branches into the road and have them tied together by threes and dragged along. You will find this of service. Don't make anything over to their masters. I shall perhaps give him nothing. I am causing them much trouble (?). Don't allow the carpenters to be altogether idle; worry them. I pray for your health.

== See also ==
- Oxyrhynchus Papyri
- Papyrus Oxyrhynchus 120
- Papyrus Oxyrhynchus 122
