= Papyrus Oxyrhynchus 101 =

Ancient Greek manuscript

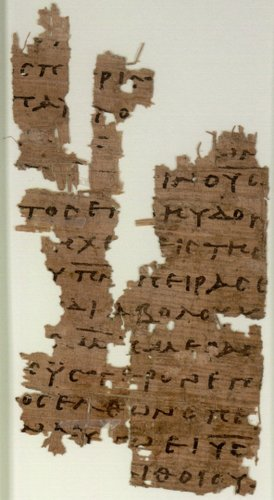
Papyrus Oxyrhynchus 101

Papyrus Oxyrhynchus 101 (P. Oxy. 101 or P. Oxy. I 101) is a document concerning the lease of some land, written in Greek and discovered in Oxyrhynchus. The manuscript was written on papyrus in the form of a sheet. The document was written on 2 October 142. Currently it is housed at the Haskell Oriental Institute (2064) at the University of Chicago.

== Description ==
The land in question was owned by Dionysia, daughter of Chaeremon. Her guardian in the deal was her son Apion, also called Dionysius. Together, they agree to lease 38 arourae of land to Psenamounis, son of Thonis and Seoëris, for six years. Psenamounis had leased the land for the previous six years. The lease explicitly gives him the right to grow any crops he chooses for the first five years of the lease, with the exception of woad and coriander (?). In the last year of the lease he is required to grow the same crops that he was required to grow under the terms of his previous lease. The rent was 190 artabae of wheat and 12 drachmae per year. The measurements of the fragment are 254 by 84 mm.

It was discovered by Grenfell and Hunt in 1897 in Oxyrhynchus. The text was published by Grenfell and Hunt in 1898.

== See also ==
- Oxyrhynchus Papyri
- Papyrus Oxyrhynchus 100
- Papyrus Oxyrhynchus 102
