= Papyrus Oxyrhynchus 119 =

Ancient Greek manuscript

Papyrus Oxyrhynchus 119 (P. Oxy. 119 or P. Oxy. I 119) is a letter from a child, written in Greek and discovered in Oxyrhynchus. The manuscript was written on papyrus in the form of a sheet. The document was written in the 2nd or 3rd century. Currently it is housed in the Bodleian Library (Ms. Gr. Class. f 66).

== Description ==
The document is a letter to a father from his youthful son. It is written in a rude uncial hand with some erasures, and the grammar and the spelling are flawed. The measurements of the fragment are 100 by 135 mm.

It was discovered by Grenfell and Hunt in 1897 in Oxyrhynchus. The text was published by Grenfell and Hunt in 1898.

== Text ==
Theon to his father Theon, greeting. It was a fine thing of you not to take me with you to the city! If you won't take me with you to Alexandria I won't write you a letter or speak to you or say goodbye to you; and if you go to Alexandria I won't take your hand nor ever greet you again. That is what will happen if you won't take me. Mother said to Archelaus, "It quite upsets him to be left behind (?)." It was good of you to send me presents ... on the 12th, the day you sailed. Send me a lyre, I implore you. If you don't, I won't eat, I won't drink; there now!

== See also ==
- Oxyrhynchus Papyri
- Papyrus Oxyrhynchus 118
- Papyrus Oxyrhynchus 120
