= Papyrus Oxyrhynchus 117 =

Ancient Greek manuscript

Papyrus Oxyrhynchus 117 (P. Oxy. 117 or P. Oxy. I 117) is a personal letter, written in Greek and discovered in Oxyrhynchus. The manuscript was written on papyrus in the form of a sheet. The document was written in the 2nd or 3rd century. Currently it is housed in the Haskell Oriental Institute (2066) at the University of Chicago.

== Description ==
The recto side of the document is a personal letter from Chaereas to his brother Dionysius. The verso side contains the address, in which Chaereas refers to himself as a limniarchos (λιμνίαρχος), an unknown term which possibly means "superintendent of lakes." The measurements of the fragment are 177 by 163 mm.

It was discovered by Grenfell and Hunt in 1897 in Oxyrhynchus. The text was published by Grenfell and Hunt in 1898.

== Text ==
Chaereas to his brother Dionysius, greeting. I have already urged you in person to have the horoscope (?) in the archives prepared and also the sale of the slaves' children, and to sell the wine that comes from both the near and the far vineyard, keeping the money in a safe place until I come. I send you some good melon seeds through Diogenes the friend of Chaereas the citizen, and two strips of cloth sealed with my seal, one of which please give to your children. Salute your sister and Cyrilla. Rhodope and Arsinous salute you. I pray for your health.

== See also ==
- Oxyrhynchus Papyri
- Papyrus Oxyrhynchus 116
- Papyrus Oxyrhynchus 118
