= Papyrus Oxyrhynchus 99 =

Ancient Greek manuscript

Papyrus Oxyrhynchus 99 (P. Oxy. 99 or P. Oxy. I 99) concerns the sale of half a house, written in Greek. It was discovered in Oxyrhynchus. The manuscript was written on papyrus in the form of a sheet The document was written on 4 September 55. Currently it is housed at the British Library (756) in London.

== Description ==
The document records the sale of half a house by Pnepheros, son of Papontos, to Tryphon, son of Dionysius, for 32 talents of copper. The document also records the payment of a tax of 3 talents, 1200 drachmae, or 10%, and another charge, the nature of which is unknown. The measurements of the fragment are 230 by 440 mm.

It was discovered by Grenfell and Hunt in 1897 in Oxyrhynchus. The text was published by Grenfell and Hunt in 1898.

== See also ==
- Oxyrhynchus Papyri
- Papyrus Oxyrhynchus 98
- Papyrus Oxyrhynchus 100
