= Ombos =

Ombos (Greek: Ὄμβος) may refer to any of several ancient cities in Egypt, including:

- Ombos, capital of its own nome, now Kom Ombo, Egypt
- Ombos, now Naqada, Egypt
