= Blemyomachia =

Fragmentary ancient Greek poem

A papyrus fragment of the poem

The Blemyomachia is an anonymous fragmentary ancient Greek epic poem of the 4th or 5th century AD. It describes a victory in battle of the Romans over the Blemmyes. Only 161 complete or partial lines are preserved from three separate papyri.

Blemyomachia (from Greek Βλεμυομαχία lit. 'Blemmyan War') is a conventional title used by modern scholars. The spellings Blemmyes and Blemyes are both found in ancient sources, but the poem uses the latter. In the Loeb Classical Library edition, however, it is titled "Praise of Germanus" and Laura Miguélez Cavero calls it "Panegyric of General Germanus". A certain Germanus is the hero of the work. He remains unidentified with any known historical person. The Prosopography of the Later Roman Empire suggests that he may be the Germanus who received two letters from Isidore of Pelusium, in which Isidore argued that true victory is that of the soul over worldly pleasure and cannot be found in battle against foreign barbarians. It is further suggested that this Germanus was the magister utriusque militiae vacans who was sent by Theodosius II against the Vandals in 441. In the poem, Germanus' return march with captives is described as follows:

Thus they followed Germanus, the bronze-mailed breaker of the ranks—on one side a throng of women in strong-twisted bonds, on the other a host of young warriors whom on the field he had taken alive, fugitives from battle. Earth moaned beneath the steps of men-at-arms and hooves of tireless horses crowded close together; shrill blared the trumpet, heralding to the fatherland the joyous victory of battle . . .

The Blemyomachia is written in Homeric Greek and in the metre (dactylic hexameter) and style of Homer. László Török calls it a "fine poetical style". Mary Whitby describes a "strongly Homeric and conservative flavour both in phraseology and in the use of typical Iliadic motifs." It has affinities to the contemporary work of Quintus Smyrnaeus. It has also been compared to the work of Tryphiodorus, but its similarity to that of Nonnus of Panopolis is a matter of dispute.

The author of the Blemyomachia is unknown. Owing to the quality of the work, several known writers have been suggested, but none conclusively. They include Ammonius, Claudian, Cyrus of Panopolis and Olympiodorus of Thebes. The poem is probably based on historical events, since there are many attested clashes with the Blemmyes in Roman Egypt in late antiquity. The poem indicates that the clash took place in the Nile Valley, but it cannot be connected with certainty to any particular action known from other sources.

The Blemyomachia was first identified from 86 lines in the fragmentary papyrus codex P.Berol. 5003. This was discovered in a tomb at Luxor and first published in 1881. A further 75 lines were found in several fragments from the monastery of Dayr Apa Phoibammon, now P.Gen. inv. 140 and P.Phoib. fragments 1a, 6a, 11c and 12c. The papyri have been dated to the 4th or 5th century on paleographic grounds. They are all written by the same hand and come from a single codex probably originally owned by the monastery. They have been edited twice and translated into English, German and Italian.

== Bibliography ==
- Eide, Tormod; Török, László (1998). "326. The Blemmyan War". In Tormod Eide; Tomas Hägg; Richard Holton Pierce; László Török (eds.). Fontes Historiae Nubiorum. Vol. 3. University of Bergen. pp. 1182–1185. Archived from the original on September 6, 2013.
- Kanavou, Nikoletta (2015). "Notes on the Blemyomachia (P. Berol. 5003 + P. Gen. inv. 140 + P. Phoib. fr. 1a/6a/11c/12c)". Tyche. 30: 55–60. doi:10.15661/tyche.2015.030.07.
- Livrea, Enrico (1976). "Chi è l'autore della 'Blemyomachia' (P. Berol. 5003)?" [Who is the author of 'Blemyomachia' (P. Berol. 5003)?]. Prometheus (in Italian). 2 (2): 97–123 – via Firenze University Press.
- Livrea, Enrico, ed. (1978). Anonymi fortasse Olympiodori Thebani Blemyomachia (P. Berol. 5003). Anton Hain.
- MacCoull, L. S. B. (1981). "Papyrus Fragments from the Monastery of Phoebammon". In Roger S. Bagnall; Gerald M. Browne; Ann E. Hanson; Ludwig Koenen (eds.). Proceedings of the Sixteenth International Congress of Papyrology, New York, 24–31 July 1980. Scholars Press. pp. 491–498.
- Martindale, John R., ed. (1980). The Prosopography of the Later Roman Empire: Volume II, AD 395–527. Cambridge: Cambridge University Press. ISBN 0-521-20159-4.
- Miguélez Cavero, Laura (2008). Poems in Context: Greek Poetry in the Egyptian Thebaid, 200–600 AD. De Gruyter.
- Page, D. L., ed. (1941). Select Papyri III: Poetry. Loeb Classical Library. Harvard University Press.
- Steinrück, Martin (1999). "Neues zur Blemyomachie" (PDF). Zeitschrift für Papyrologie und Epigraphik. 126: 99–114.
- West, M. L. (1980). "Review of Livrea 1978". The Classical Review. 30 (1): 276. doi:10.1017/S0009840X0023566X.
- Whitby, Mary (1994). "From Moschus to Nonnus: The Evolution of the Nonnian Style". In Neil Hopkinson (ed.). Studies in the Dionysiaca of Nonnus. Cambridge Philological Society. pp. 99–155.
