= Papyrus Oxyrhynchus 114 =

Greek manuscript

Papyrus Oxyrhynchus 114 (P. Oxy. 114 or P. Oxy. I 114) is a letter concerning pawned property, written in Greek and discovered in Oxyrhynchus. The manuscript was written on papyrus in the form of a sheet. The document was written in the 2nd or 3rd century. Currently it is housed in the library of Eton College in Windsor, England.

== Description ==
The document is a letter from Eunoea giving instructions to a friend to redeem a number of pawned articles. It contains a number of Greek words not otherwise known, of which the meanings are obscure. The measurements of the fragment are 114 by 165 mm.

It was discovered by Grenfell and Hunt in 1897 in Oxyrhynchus. The text was published by Grenfell and Hunt in 1898.

== Text ==
Now please redeem my property from Sarapion. It is pledged for two minae. I have paid the interest up to Epeiph [Epiphi], at the rate of a stater per mina. There is a casket (?) of incense-wood, and another of onyx, a tunic, a white veil with a real purple (border?), a handkerchief, a tunic with a Laconian stripe, a garment of purple linen, 2 armlets, a necklace, a coverlet, a figure of Aphrodite, a cup, a big tin flask and a wine jar. From Onetor get the 2 bracelets. They have been pledged since Tybi of last year for eight ... at the rate of a stater per mina. If the cash is insufficient owing to the carelessness of Theagenis, if, I say, it is insufficient, sell the bracelets to make up the money. Many salutations to Aia and Eutychia and Alexandra. Xanthilla salutes Aia and all her friends. I pray for your health.

== See also ==
- Oxyrhynchus Papyri
- Papyrus Oxyrhynchus 113
- Papyrus Oxyrhynchus 115
