= Papyrus Oxyrhynchus 115 =

Greek manuscript

Papyrus Oxyrhynchus 115 (P. Oxy. 115 or P. Oxy. I 115) is a letter of consolation, written in Greek and discovered in Oxyrhynchus. The manuscript was written on papyrus in the form of a sheet. The document was written in the 2nd century. Currently it is housed in the Beinecke Rare Book and Manuscript Library (32) at Yale University.

== Description ==
The recto side of the document is a letter of consolation from Irene to Taonnophris and Philo, expressing her sympathy with them for the death of Eumoerus. The verso side contains the address "to Taonnophris and Philo." The measurements of the fragment are 79 by 77 mm.

It was discovered by Grenfell and Hunt in 1897 in Oxyrhynchus. The text was published by Grenfell and Hunt in 1898.

== Text ==
Irene to Taonnophris and Philo, good cheer! I was as much grieved and shed as many tears over Eumoerus as I shed for Didymas, and I did everything that was fitting, and so did all my friends, Epaphroditus and Thermouthion and Philion and Apollonius and Plantas. But still there is nothing one can do in the face of such trouble. So I leave you to comfort yourselves. Goodbye. Athyr 1.

== See also ==
- Oxyrhynchus Papyri
- Papyrus Oxyrhynchus 114
- Papyrus Oxyrhynchus 116
