= Arura =

Arura (Ancient Greek: ἄρουρα, romanized: aroura) is a Homeric Greek word with original meaning "arable land", derived from the verb ἀρόω (aroō), "plough". The word was also used generally for earth, land and father-land and in plural to describe corn-lands and fields. The term arura was also used to describe a measure of land in ancient Egypt (similar in manner to the acre), a square of 100 Egyptian cubits each way. This measures 2700m² or 2/3 of an acre. The oldest attested form of the word is the Mycenaean Greek a-ro-u-ra, written in Linear B syllabic script, originally meant "plough".

== Other uses ==
- Aruru, a Mesopotamian goddess associated with vegetation at some point conflated with Ninhursag
- 'Arura, a Palestinian village in the northern "West Bank".
