= Papyrus Oxyrhynchus 68 =

Greek manuscript

Papyrus Oxyrhynchus 68 (P. Oxy. 68) concerns a dispute over a debt, written in Greek. The manuscript was written on papyrus in the form of a sheet. It was discovered by Grenfell and Hunt in 1897 in Oxyrhynchus. The document was written on 25 June 131. Currently it is housed in the John Rylands University Library in Manchester. The text was published by Grenfell and Hunt in 1898.

The letter was addressed to a high official, probably the epistrategus, petitioning for his intervention. The name of the author is lost. He disputes the validity of a claim for payment by the author's son Sarapion against the son's maternal grandfather's estate. The measurements of the fragment are 182 by 92 mm.

== See also ==
- Oxyrhynchus Papyri
- Papyrus Oxyrhynchus 67
- Papyrus Oxyrhynchus 69
