= Linford =

Linford may refer to:

Places:

- Linford, Essex, a location in England
- Linford, Hampshire, England
- Great Linford, historic village in the northern part of Milton Keynes, England
- Little Linford, village in the Borough of Milton Keynes, England
- Newtown Linford, linear village in Leicestershire, England

Given name:

- Linford Christie OBE (born 1960), former athlete who specialised in the 100 metres
- Herbert Linford Gwyer, the second Bishop of George, and a survivor of the sinking of the Lusitania
- Linford Carey, Professor of Speech and Theatre in New York City

Surname:

- Colin Linford, president of the Canadian Soccer Association until August 2007
- John Linford (born 1957), retired English footballer
- Lewis Linford (born 1987), British actor
- Steve Linford, British anti-spam campaigner, founder of The Spamhaus Project

Other:

- Linford Group, construction company in the United Kingdom which specializes in the restoration of historic buildings
- Linford Manor, old mansion or manor house converted into a recording studio complex in Great Linford
