= Thomas Tout =

British historian (1855–1929)

Thomas Tout FBA FRHistS
- Born: Thomas Frederick Tout; 28 September 1855; London, England
- Died: 23 October 1929 (aged 74); London, England
- Occupation: Historian
- Title: Professor of History
- Spouse: Mary Johnstone

Academic background
- Education: St Olave's Grammar School
- Alma mater: Balliol College, Oxford

Thomas Frederick Tout (28 September 1855 – 23 October 1929) was a British historian of the medieval period. He was one of the founders of the Historical Association in 1906.

== Early life ==
Born in London, Tout was a pupil of St. Olave's Grammar School, still then at Southwark, a graduate of Balliol College, Oxford, and a fellow of Pembroke, but failing to obtain permanent fellowships at All Souls (1879) and Lincoln, his first academic post was at St David's University College, Lampeter (now the University of Wales, Lampeter), where his job title was "Professor of English and Modern Languages.

While at Lampeter, Tout commenced his prolific production of articles for the Dictionary of National Biography, including the entry on the theologian Rowland Williams. He learned Welsh, wrote and lectured on Welsh history, and contributed many of the Welsh articles to the DNG, including some on modern as well as medieval figures. His descendants have said that this famous outpouring of influential biographical ur-essays was due to no more than the sheer poverty of a young married academic needing cash for words. However, this does not do justice either to the value of Tout's entries or to the role it played in his own development as a writer. Tout also had a flair for writing textbooks and he not only covered English medieval history but was also able to offer concise views of the Middle Ages on the Continent. Some of these texts had a very long life in the schools. It seems that the historical importance of the priceless Lampeter Tract Collection, mostly collected by members of the Bowdler family and held in the college's Founders' Library, was not fully recognised at Lampeter until T. F. Tout arrived at the college. With his friend, C. H. Firth, who was an external examiner for St David's for a number of years, Tout rescued the collection from neglect, arranging for seventy-two volumes to be rebound, rearranging the contents of some, and bringing together, for example, all the Civil War and Commonwealth newspapers scattered throughout the collection, into four volumes arranged in chronological order. Tout was the most distinguished member of the Lampeter staff at this time, and was soon styled professor of history.

== Professor of History ==
In 1890, Tout left Lampeter and became professor of history at Owens College, Manchester (a constituent college of the Victoria University), where he stayed until 1925 (this changed to the University of Manchester in 1903). In 1894 he failed to gain the chair at Glasgow. Tout was, with James Tait, one of the two leading figures of the 'Manchester History School', and is best known for his 6-volume Chapters in the Administrative History of Medieval England, whose influence still remains and was for 40 years magisterial in the shaping of late medieval English History scholarship. Concentrating, through close study of the Crown's administrative records, on how changes of government-method reflected changes in the nature of power and politics, the work stood the test of 19th-century constitutional history and mid-20th-century socio-political emphasis with very few fundamental criticisms of Tout's methods and conclusions. Other works included The Political History of England, 1216–1377 (1905) and The Place of the Reign of Edward II in English History (1914), comprising the Ford Lectures at Oxford University in 1913. Tout published a heavily revised second edition in 1926. Tout was also prolific in writing short, sharp articles about the significance of particular documents he had found, most of which still stand up impressively. He was president of the Royal Historical Society from 1925 to 1929. He was a member of the Chetham Society, and served as a member of Council from 1907 to 1929.

Tout served from 1919 to 1921 as the first chairman of the Central Organisation of Military Education Committees of the Universities and University Colleges, what is now the Council of Military Education Committees of the Universities of the United Kingdom (COMEC).

=== Undergraduate and postgraduate research ===
Tout introduced original research into the undergraduate programme, culminating in the production of a Final Year thesis based on primary sources. This horrified Oxbridge, where college tutors had little research capacity of their own and saw the undergraduate as an embryonic future gentleman, liberal connoisseur, widely read, and mainstay of country and empire in politics, commerce, army, land or church, not an apprentice to dusty, centuries-old archives, wherein no more than 1 in 100 could find even an innocuous career. In taking this view they had a fair case, given the various likelihoods and opportunities for their charges. Tout's ally C. H. Firth fought a bitter campaign to persuade Oxford to follow Manchester and introduce scientific study of sources into the History programme, but failed; there was failure too, at Cambridge. Other universities, however, followed Tout, and Oxbridge, but very slowly, had to face up to the fact, and fundamental changes to the selection of college fellows across all disciplines ensued.

Tout is, moreover, also thought to be responsible for the appointment of the first female academic at Manchester University. Alice Margaret Cooke joined his department as a lecturer in 1893. A sign of both Tout's interest in encouraging women to pursue academic careers and his commitment to primary research is displayed as early as 1902. In that year, with his colleague James Tait, he edited a volume of "Manchester Essays" displaying the scholarly work being done at the new university. As editors, the two men collected papers from young scholars as well as from some senior Manchester figures. They included work by several women and—in keeping with a long-term interest of Tout—they published papers on teaching history in the secondary schools. Tout's interest in how history was taught at pre-university levels is also borne out by his many years on the governing board of the Historical Association, with its dedication to bridging the gap between academic research and the teaching of history.

=== Papers ===
Tout was actively involved in the life and running of Manchester University and of the John Rylands Library where he served on the council of governors, but, apart from letters from A. W. Ward, his papers, now housed in the John Rylands Library, contain more information on general academic affairs elsewhere around the country and about his own historical research than the affairs of his own University. The collection is greater in quantity than quality, and his wife's supplementary files might actually be of greater interest. Letters from former pupils serving in World War I are noteworthy, as are those from their bereaved relatives. Though we have the letters to Tout, rather than from him, in this moving correspondence with young men who went from academia to the Western Front, it shows his interest in teaching and in his students. Meanwhile, at the level of Manchester University research, a number of his students went on to become major medievalists in the years after World War I, while the Festschrift (1925) in his honor shows his standing among major historians on the Continent and in North America as well as in Great Britain.

Seeking to enlarge the historical research materials available in Manchester for the benefit of its university's students, Tout planned the ordered development of the university's library and built upon the foundation of E. A. Freeman's library (acquired in 1890). In collaboration with Henry Guppy, librarian of the John Rylands Library, archival resources for medieval England were obtained so that they could be studied without travels to other parts of the country. Tout was a leading force in the creation of the Manchester University Press as it emerged as an important imprint for both medieval and modern scholarship.

=== Personal life ===
Tout married Mary Johnstone and lived at 14 Mauldeth Road, on the Fallowfield/Withington border, and later moved to 1 Oak Drive, Fallowfield. He and his wife, Mary, moved south to 3 Oak Hill Park, Hampstead, shortly before his formal retirement. He was a devout Anglican and died in 1929. Their daughter Margaret [Sharpe] was also an academic medieval historian, based at Bristol University. James Tait punningly said of Tout: "Tout comprendre, c'est Tout pardonner" (meaning in English: If one understands Tout one can forgive him too).

== Publications ==
- Chapters in the Administrative History of Medieval England: The Wardrobe, the Chamber and the Small Seals. (Manchester University Press, 1920–1933) Vol. 1 • Vol. 2 • Vol. 3 • Vol. 4 • Vol. 5 • Vol. 6
- Other publications by Tout on Archive.org

== See also ==
- Historiography of the United Kingdom

Academic offices
| Preceded by John William Fortescue | President of the Royal Historical Society; 1925–1929 | Succeeded by Richard Lodge |
