= Alice Margaret Cooke =

Historian and writer

- Born: 18 September 1867; Hulme
- Died: 26 January 1940 (aged 72); Manchester

Alice Margaret Cooke (18 September 1867 – 26 January 1940) was a British historian and writer. Cooke catalogued the books in the John Rylands Library and she helped in the development of higher education for women in Manchester.

== Life ==
Cooke was born in Hulme in Lancashire in 1867 to John and Eliza Anderson (born Jackson) Cooke. Following private education she went to Manchester High School for Girls where she was identified as academic. She could attend Owens College, Manchester (by then part of the Victoria University), since the college had allowed women to attend a few years before and she was able to live with her parents. The university had limited provisions for co-educational education. She liked history and she won the Bradford history scholarship in 1888 which assisted her in gaining not only a first class degree in history in 1890, but also the Jones fellowship. The fellowship funded post-graduate research which resulted in a publication in 1893 of what became the standard account of early Cistercian monasteries.

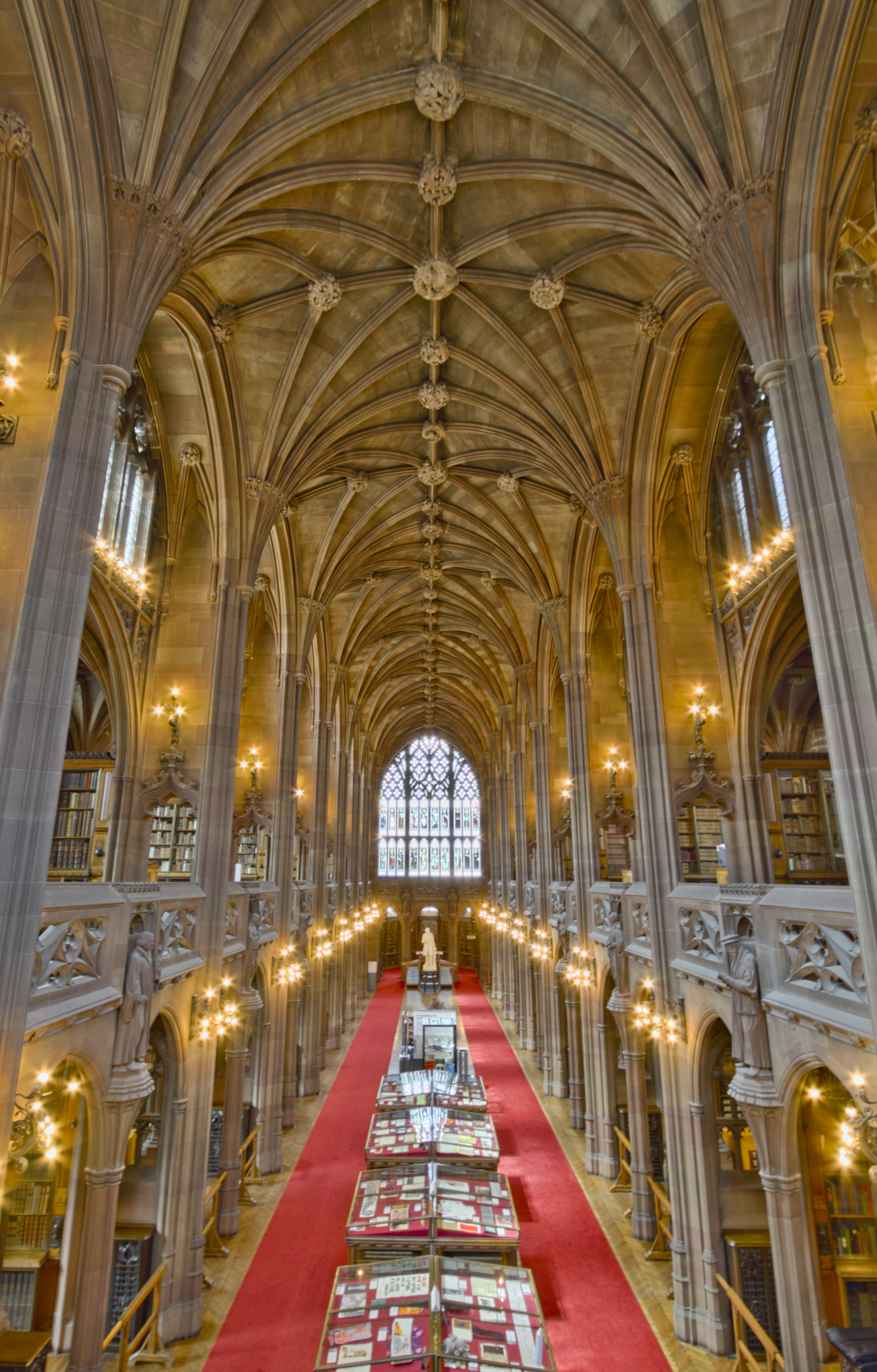
The John Rylands Library reading room

1893 also saw Cooke become the first woman lecturer working for Thomas Frederick Tout at her alma mater and the first recipient of a master's degree from Owens College: the university did not award history doctorates at that time. She also took various roles to assist female students who were following her path and she became a governor of the university and assistant tutor to women students in 1897. Cooke travelled and cycled and supported women's suffrage. A notable academic task was her compilation of an index to Earl Spencer's Althorp Library. It had been the most expensive library collection ever purchased when the millionairess Enriqueta Rylands paid £210,000 for it. The indexing was undertaken at the request of Mrs Rylands, for the nascent John Rylands Library. Cooke also sorted an autograph collection created by Thomas Raffles for Enriqueta Rylands.

In 1901 Cooke moved to Cardiff where she lectured in the history department of the University College of South Wales and Monmouthshire. She was there until 1903 when she returned to cataloguing libraries. In this case it was Lord Acton's Library in Cambridge which consisted of over 60,000 books. From 1905 she returned to teaching, this time it was modern history at Cambridge University's Newnham College.

In 1907 she moved to Leeds University where she was the lecturer in history. In Leeds she improved the university library's medieval collection and she established a medieval history department. In 1909 she was intrigued by the life of St Francis after a visit to Assisi. She was to spend twenty years putting together her research on St Francis.

After the war her health deteriorated which may have been due to her work as a Leeds policewoman during the conflict. After a lengthy convalescence she returned to Newnham College where she was director of studies in the history department. Cooke retired in 1927 where she lived with a companion. In 1934 she became an invalid and she was cared for by nuns in Manchester until her death in 1940.

== Legacy ==
Cooke wrote 40 biographies of medieval subjects for the Dictionary of National Biography. A biography of her life was published by Isaline Blew Horner. Besides her cataloguing of the two libraries mentioned above she also created indexes for the Cambridge Modern History. Her contribution to the foundation of the John Rylands Library was important, but her major contribution is either improving higher education provision for women in Manchester or her advocacy of research led teaching. The leading female undergraduate in their final year at Leeds University is given a prize in honour of Cooke.
