= Papyrus Oxyrhynchus 67 =

Egyptian manuscript

Papyrus Oxyrhynchus 67 (P. Oxy. 67) contains three letters about a dispute concerning property, written in Greek. The manuscript was written on papyrus in the form of a sheet. It was discovered by Grenfell and Hunt in 1897 in Oxyrhynchus. The document was written on 28 March 338. Currently it is housed in the British Library (754) in London. The text was published by Grenfell and Hunt in 1898.

The first letter is addressed to Aurelius Aetius by Aurelius Ptolemaeus. The second is a letter concerning the same matter from Flavius Theodorus Antonius, praefect of Egypt. The third letter is from Ptolemaeus to the praefect, asking him to act as a judge in the matter. The letters are thus contained in the papyrus in reverse chronological order. There are two existing copies of this papyrus. The text published by Grenfell and Hunt is a collation of the contents of the two copies. The measurements of the fragment are 257 by 364 mm.

== See also ==
- Oxyrhynchus Papyri
- Papyrus Oxyrhynchus 66
- Papyrus Oxyrhynchus 68
