= Papyrus Oxyrhynchus 63 =

Greek papyrus fragment

Papyrus Oxyrhynchus 63 (P. Oxy. 63) is a letter concerning the lading and inspection of wheat, written in Greek. The manuscript was written on papyrus in the form of a sheet. It was discovered by Grenfell and Hunt in 1897 in Oxyrhynchus. The document was written in the second or the third century. Currently it is housed in the Egyptian Museum (Cat. Gen. 10007) in Cairo. The text was published by Grenfell and Hunt in 1898.

The letter was addressed to Archelaus, a minor official, giving him instructions about carrying out the inspection and directing him to obtain a donkey from the chiefs of police for that purpose. It was written by Paësius. The measurements of the fragment are 205 by 121 mm.

== See also ==
- Oxyrhynchus Papyri
- Papyrus Oxyrhynchus 62
- Papyrus Oxyrhynchus 64
