= Papyrus Oxyrhynchus 64 =

Greek manuscript

Papyrus Oxyrhynchus 64 (P. Oxy. 64) is an order for an arrest, written in Greek. The manuscript was written on papyrus in the form of a sheet. It was discovered by Grenfell and Hunt in 1897 in Oxyrhynchus. The document was written in the third or the early fourth century. Currently it is housed in the Princeton University Library (AM 1094) in Princeton. The text was published by Grenfell and Hunt in 1898.

The letter was addressed to the chiefs of the village of Teis, asking them to deliver a person named Ammonius for trial. It was written by an unknown decurion. The measurements of the fragment are 53 by 158 mm. The document is similar to Papyrus Oxyrhynchus 65.

== See also ==
- Oxyrhynchus Papyri
- Papyrus Oxyrhynchus 63
- Papyrus Oxyrhynchus 65
