= Papyrus Oxyrhynchus 66 =

Egyptian manuscript

Papyrus Oxyrhynchus 66 (P. Oxy. 66) consists of two letters concerning the erection of a statue to a praefect, written in Greek. The manuscript was written on papyrus in the form of a sheet. It was discovered by Grenfell and Hunt in 1897 in Oxyrhynchus. The document was written on 4 July 357. Currently, it is housed in the Cambridge University Library (MS Add.4038) in Cambridge. The text was published by Grenfell and Hunt in 1898.

One of the letters is from Flavius Eutrygius, logistes, and (probably) Apion, strategus, to Aurelius Sineeis, probably a sculptor, ordering the construction of a statue of the praefect Pomponius Metrodorus. The other letter, which is incomplete, is Aurelius's reply. The measurements of the fragment are 137 by 101 mm.

== See also ==
- Oxyrhynchus Papyri
- Papyrus Oxyrhynchus 65
- Papyrus Oxyrhynchus 67
