= Papyrus Oxyrhynchus 61 =

Greek papyrus fragment

Papyrus Oxyrhynchus 61 (P. Oxy. 61) is a notice of the payment of a fine, written in Greek. The manuscript was written on papyrus in the form of a sheet. It was discovered by Grenfell and Hunt in 1897 in Oxyrhynchus. The document was written on 18 November 221. Currently it is housed in the Cambridge University Library (MS Add.4037) in Cambridge. The text was published by Grenfell and Hunt in 1898.

The letter was written by strategus Aurelius Sarapion to the government bank at Oxyrhynchus. The measurements of the fragment are 221 by 84 mm.

== See also ==
- Oxyrhynchus Papyri
- Papyrus Oxyrhynchus 60
- Papyrus Oxyrhynchus 62
