= Enriqueta Augustina Rylands =

English philanthropist and collector (1843–1908)

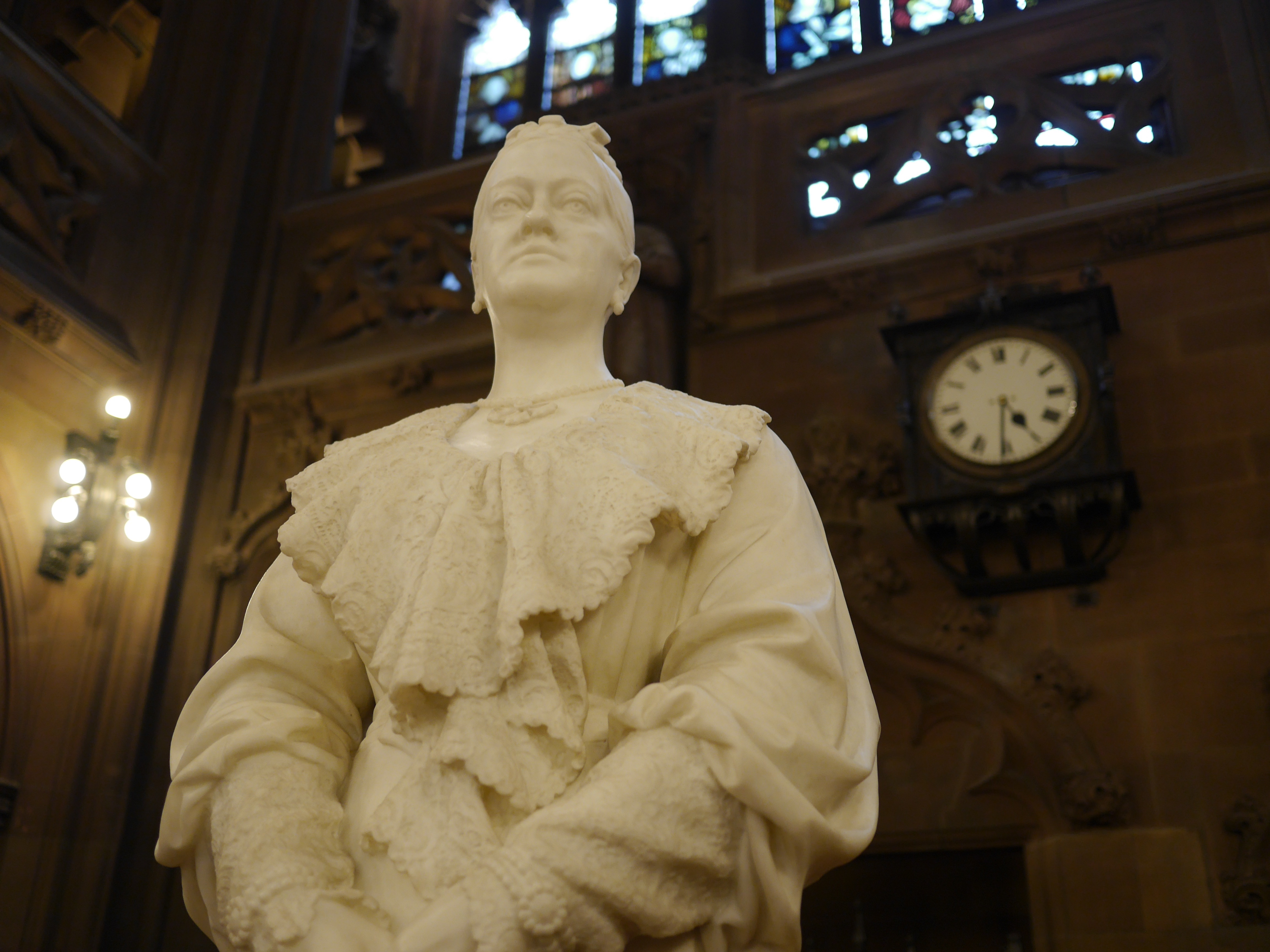
- Statue by John Cassidy in the library's main hall
- Born: 31 May 1843; Havana, Cuba
- Died: 4 February 1908 (aged 64); Torquay, England
- Known for: Founder of John Rylands Library
- Spouse: John Rylands

Enriqueta Augustina Rylands (31 May 1843 – 4 February 1908) was a British philanthropist who founded the John Rylands Library in Manchester.

== Early life ==
Enriqueta Augustina was born in Havana, Cuba, and was one of five children including José Esteban (later Stephen Joseph, who was her twin brother), Blanca Catalina and Leocadia Fernanda. Her father was Stephen Cattley Tennant (1800–1848), a merchant whose family came from Yorkshire, northern England, and her mother, Juana Camila Dalcour (1818–1855).

Tennant retired to Liverpool, but died within a year. His widow migrated to Paris and married pianist and polymath Julian Fontana. Juana and Julian had one son, Enriqueta's half brother, Julian (Jules) Camillo Adam Fontana, who was born in 1853. Enriqueta Tennant was raised a Roman Catholic and completed her education in New York, London and Paris. In later life she abandoned Catholicism and became a Congregationalist, under the influence of the Rev. Thomas Raffles (1788–1863).

== At Longford Hall, Stretford ==
Sometime after 1860, Enriqueta became companion to Martha, the wife of wealthy Manchester merchant John Rylands whose residence was Longford Hall in Stretford. She joined the congregation of Cavendish Congregational Church, Chorlton-on-Medlock. In 1875, eight months after Martha's death, Enriqueta married John Rylands, then aged 74. The ceremony was held in Kensington, London, on 6 October. The marriage was childless but two children were adopted: Arthur Forbes (a cousin of Enriqueta) and Maria Castiglioni. When John Rylands died in 1888, Enriqueta as the inheritor of most of his estate of £2,574,922 became a major shareholder of his family textile firm and in the Manchester Ship Canal.

== The Rylands Library ==
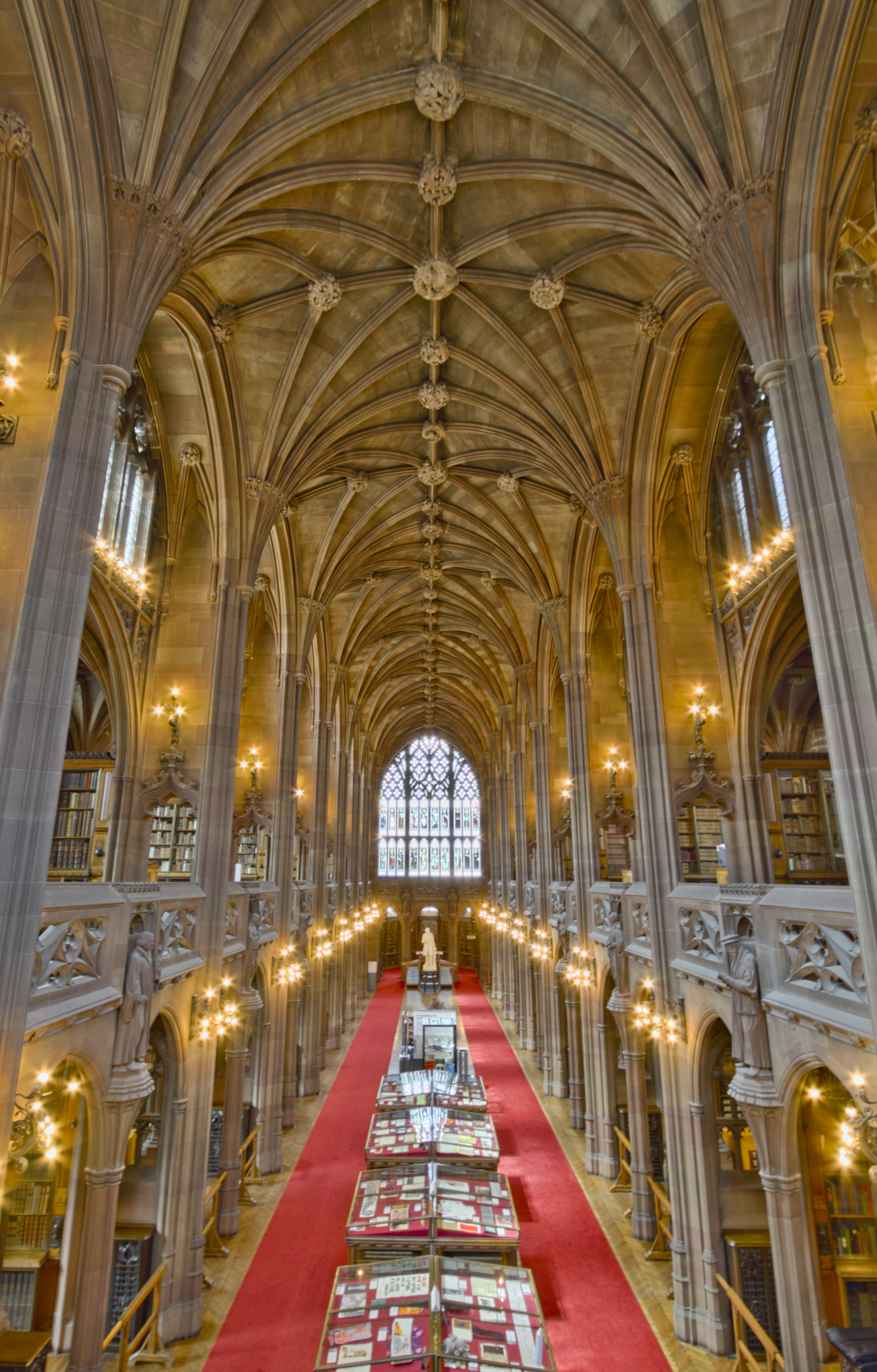
The John Rylands Library reading room

In memory of her husband, Enriqueta founded the John Rylands Library. She admired the design of Basil Champneys's library for Mansfield College, Oxford, and contracted him to develop something similar, on a more lavish scale. She secretly negotiated the purchase of the 2nd Earl Spencer's library, built up by Thomas Dibdin, which the 5th Earl Spencer put up for sale in 1892. The library purchase was for the record price of £210,000 and she commissioned the Manchester academic Alice Cooke to index it.

The library was inaugurated on 6 October 1899, the anniversary of her marriage. On the same day, she was admitted to the Freedom of the City of Manchester, the first woman to be so honoured. She was committed to many philanthropic and missionary causes and bequeathed much of her wealth to educational and medical institutions (including the Victoria University of Manchester and the library she had founded). She received the honorary degree Doctor of Literature (D.Litt.) from the Victoria University in February 1902, in connection with the 50th jubilee celebrations of the establishment of Owens College.

In 1901, Mrs Rylands paid £155,000 for more than 6,000 manuscripts owned by James Lindsay, 26th Earl of Crawford of Haigh Hall. The Bibliotheca Lindesiana was one of the most impressive private collections in Britain at the time, both for its size and the rarity of some of its contents.

A full-length statue of Mrs Rylands, by Manchester sculptor John Cassidy, was commissioned by supporters of the Library and unveiled on 9 December 1907, a few months before her death.

== Later life ==
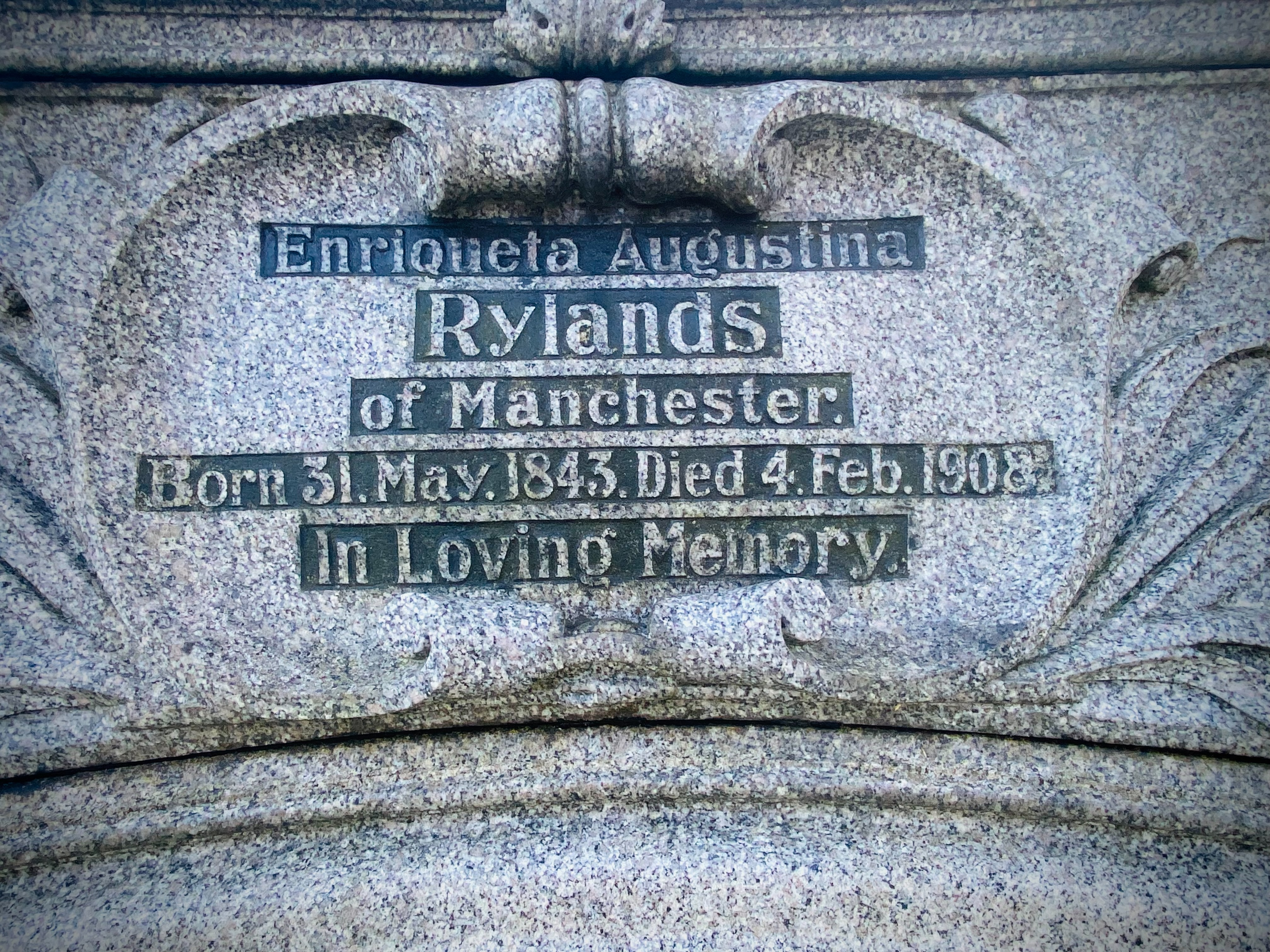
Enriqueta is commemorated on the Rylands Tomb in Southern Cemetery, Manchester

In later life she was affected by rheumatic symptoms and spent frequent periods convalescing overseas. In 1894, she purchased a villa in Torquay where she died 14 years later on 4 February 1908. Following her funeral in Stretford, Manchester, she was cremated and the ashes interred in the vault where her husband had been buried twenty years earlier in the Southern Cemetery, Manchester.
