= Papyrus Oxyrhynchus 69 =

Greek robbery complaint, from the year 190

Papyrus Oxyrhynchus 69 (P. Oxy. 69) is a complaint about a robbery, written in Greek. The manuscript was written on papyrus in the form of a sheet. It was discovered by Grenfell and Hunt in 1897 in Oxyrhynchus. The document was written on 21 November 190. Currently it is housed in the Institute for the Study of Ancient Cultures at the University of Chicago. The text was published by Grenfell and Hunt in 1898.

The beginning of the letter is lost. It is a petition to an unknown official describing the theft of some barley and asking that an investigation be carried out. The author is unknown. The measurements of the fragment are 178 by 115 mm. The description of the crime scene is quite detailed:

... they broke down a door that led into the public street and had been blocked up with bricks, probably using a log of wood as a battering-ram. They then entered the house and contented themselves with taking what was stored there, 10 artabae of barley, which they carried off by the same way. We guessed that this was removed piecemeal by the said door from the marks of a rope dragged along in that direction, and pointed out this fact to the chief of the police of that village and to the other officials.

10 artabae are equivalent to approximately 30–40 kilograms (66–88 lb) of barley.

== See also ==
- Oxyrhynchus Papyri
- Papyrus Oxyrhynchus 68
- Papyrus Oxyrhynchus 70
