= Minuscule 702 =

- New Testament manuscript
- Text: Gospels †
- Date: 12th century
- Script: Greek
- Now at: John Rylands Library, Manchester
- Size: 21.3 cm by 17 cm
- Type: Byzantine text-type/mixed
- Category: none

Minuscule 702 (in the Gregory-Aland numbering), ε2010 (von Soden), is a Greek minuscule manuscript of the New Testament, on parchment. Palaeographically, it has been assigned to the 12th century. The manuscript has complex contents.

== Description ==
The codex contains the text of the New Testament on 143 parchment leaves (size 21.3 cm by 17 cm). It has numerous lacunae (Matthew 1:1-7:20; 8:26-10:8; 17:19-18:24; 20:31-21:31 Mark 13:27-14:11; 16:18-20; Luke 2:16-3:8; 17:13-18:1; 22:8-32; 24:22-53; John 5:9-30; 6:8-29; 7:4-28; 7:48-8:19; (11, 12); 11:38-21:25).

The text is written in one columns per page, 30 lines per page.

The text is divided according to the κεφαλαια (chapters), which numbers are given at the left margin; the τιτλοι (titles) are given at the top. There is also a division according to the Ammonian Sections (in Mark 233, 16:9), with a references to the Eusebian Canons.

It contains the tables of the κεφαλαια before each Gospel, lectionary markings at the margin, and subscriptions.

== Text ==
Kurt Aland the Greek text of the codex did not place in any Category.

According to the Claremont Profile Method it represents mixed Byzantine text, related to the textual family K^{x} in Luke 1 and Luke 20. In Luke 10 no profile was made.

== History ==
Scrivener dated the manuscript to the 13th century, Gregory dated the manuscript to the 14th century. Currently the manuscript is dated by the INTF to the 12th century.

It was added to the list of New Testament manuscripts by Scrivener (886^{e}). and Gregory (702).

Formerly it was housed in London but is now housed at the John Rylands Library (Gr. Ms. 16) in Manchester.

== See also ==
- List of New Testament minuscules
- Biblical manuscript
- Textual criticism
