= John Rylands =

British businessman

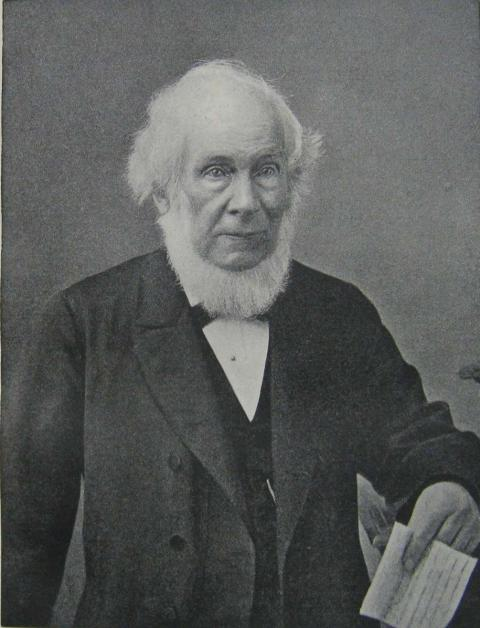
- Born: 7 February 1801; Parr, St Helens, Lancashire, England
- Died: 11 December 1888 (aged 87); Stretford, Lancashire, England
- Spouse(s): Dinah Raby (m. 1825), Martha Carden (m. 1848), Enriqueta Augustina (m. 1875)
- Children: 6
- Parent(s): Joseph Rylands and Elizabeth (née) Pilkington

John Rylands (7 February 1801 – 11 December 1888) was an English entrepreneur and philanthropist. He was the owner of the largest textile manufacturing concern in the United Kingdom, and Manchester's first multi-millionaire. He is well known for the library founded in his memory by his widow.

After having learned to weave, Rylands became a small-scale manufacturer of hand-looms, while also working in the draper's shop which his father had opened in St Helens. He displayed a "precocious shrewdness" for retailing, and in partnership with his two elder brothers expanded into the wholesale trade. So successful were they that, in 1819, Rylands' father merged his retail business with theirs, creating the firm of Rylands & Sons. At its peak, the company employed a workforce of 15,000 in 17 mills and factories, producing 35 long tons of cloth a day.

== Biography ==
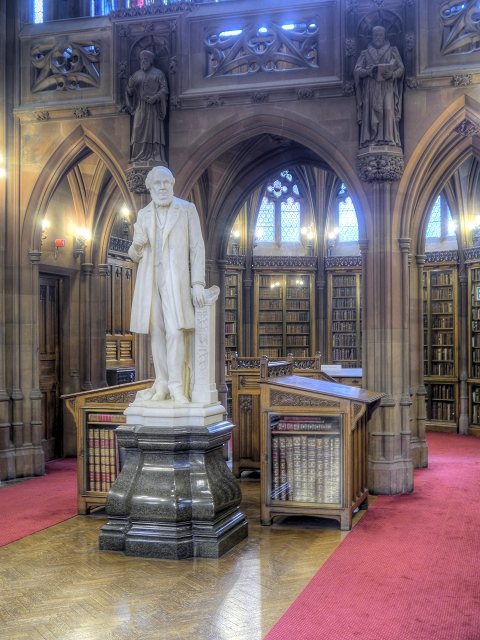
Statue of John Rylands by John Cassidy (1899) in the Rylands Library Reading Room

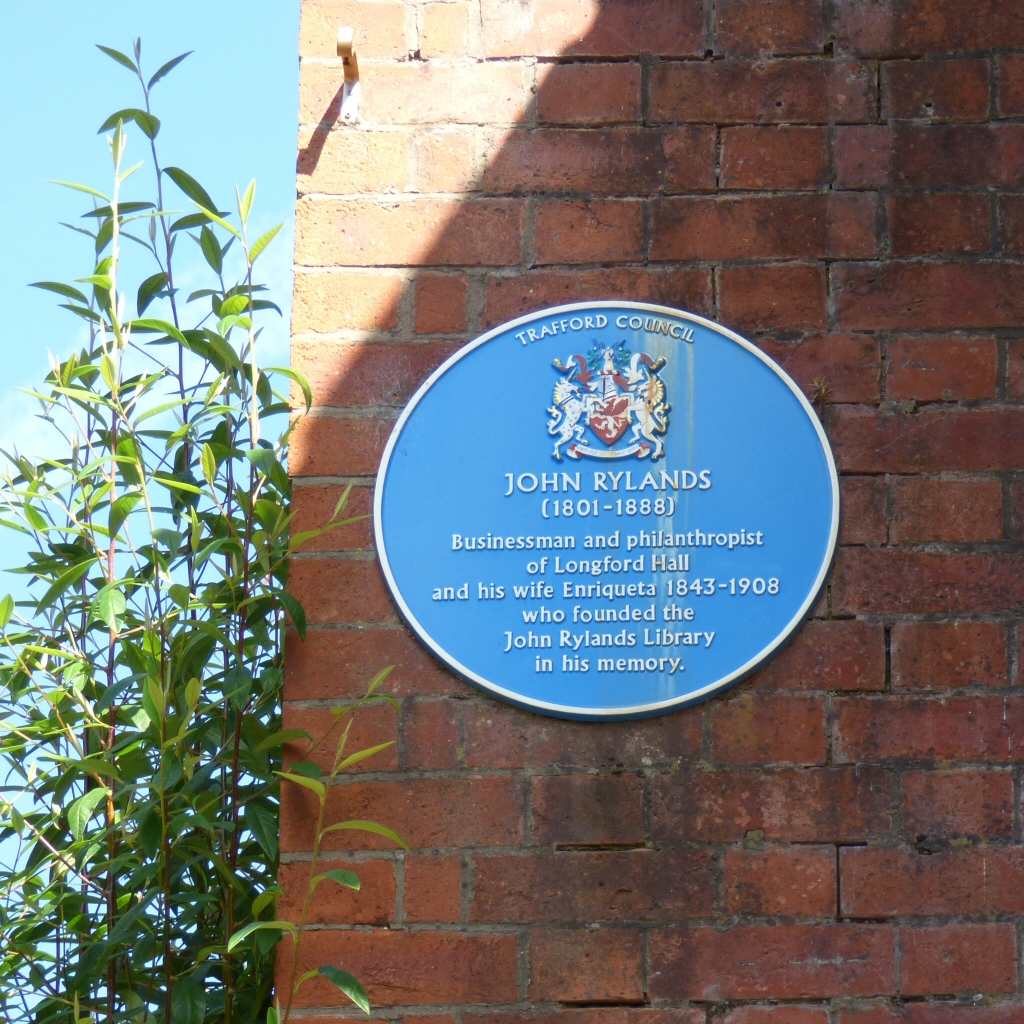
The commemorative plaque at the site of Longford Hall, Stretford, the home of John Rylands

Rylands was the third son of Joseph Rylands, a manufacturer of cotton goods, of St Helens, Lancashire, and his wife Elizabeth (née Pilkington). He was educated at St Helens Grammar School.

His aptitude for trade quickly became obvious and manifested itself early and, before the age of eighteen, he entered into partnership with his elder brothers Joseph and Richard. Their father joined them in 1819, when the firm of Rylands & Sons was established, the seat of operations being established in Wigan. Their manufactures for some years consisted of ginghams, checks, ticks, dowlases, calicoes and linens.

John, the youngest partner, occupied himself with travelling over several counties for orders until 1823, when he opened a warehouse for the firm in Manchester. Business increased rapidly, and in the course of a few years extensive properties at Wigan, along with dye works and bleach works, were purchased. Valuable seams of coal were afterwards discovered under these properties, and proved a great source of wealth to the purchasers.

In 1825 the firm became merchants as well as manufacturers, and about the same time they erected a new spinning mill. The Ainsworth mills, near Bolton, and other factories were subsequently acquired.

Joseph and Richard retired around 1839 and the death of their father in July 1847 made John Rylands sole proprietor. The business continued to expand and in 1849 a warehouse was opened in Wood Street, London.

A great fire occurred at the Manchester warehouse in 1854 but the loss, although very large, was speedily repaired. By 1864 the warehouses were seven storeys high and extended all the way along New High Street (now High Street) in Manchester: "they had become the summit of the firm's hierarchical organization, the seat of its central power and the goal of all ambitious employees" (D. A. Farnie, in "John Rylands of Manchester", 1973).

In 1873, Rylands converted his business into a limited company but he retained sole management of it. The extra capital from this move led to the purchase of more mills and the company entered into fresh business in many quarters of the globe. The firm, which had a capital of £2 million, became the largest textile manufacturing concern in the UK. His business made him Manchester's first multi-millionaire. He employed 15,000 people in his 17 mills and factories, which produced 35 long tons (39 short tons) of cloth a day.

From 1857, John Rylands lived at Longford Hall, in Stretford, an Italianate mansion he built on the site of an earlier house. In 2009 the local council placed a "blue plaque" at the site of Longford Hall to commemorate John and Enriqueta Rylands.

He was a liveryman of the Worshipful Company of Curriers.

=== Public works ===
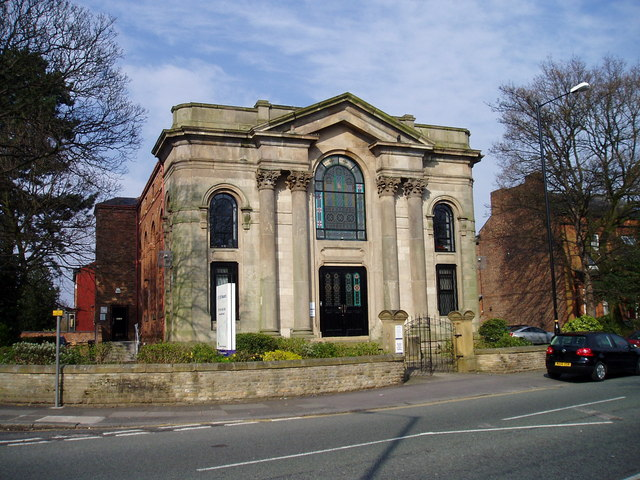
Former Union Baptist Chapel, Edge Lane, Stretford (opened by John Rylands, 1867), later the Rylands Hall, offices of the St Vincent Housing Association

Rylands was retired and reserved except in the company of his friends, and always shrank from public office of any kind, although he was not indifferent to public interests. He was politically liberal in his enterprises. When the Manchester Ship Canal was mooted, and there seemed a doubt as to the ways and means for the enterprise, he took up £50,000 worth of shares, increasing his contribution when the project appeared again in danger. Rylands was a Congregationalist, with leanings to the Baptist form of faith. He was of an ecumenical spirit and hoped that sectarian differences would tend to decrease: a number of Union Chapels (including one in Stretford and two in Manchester) were supported by him. His charities were numerous but unobtrusive. Among other benefactions, he established and maintained orphanages, homes for aged gentlewomen, a home of rest for ministers of slender means, and he provided a town hall, public baths, library and a coffeehouse in the town of Stretford, where he lived. He also built an institute for the benefit of the villagers of Havenstreet on the Isle of Wight, where Rylands passed some of his later years from 1882, having built a house named Longford there after his mainland estate. His donations to the poor of Rome were so generous as to induce the king to decorate him in 1880 with the Order of the Crown of Italy.

For many years, Rylands employed the Rev. F. Bugby, John Gaskin, and other competent scholars to prepare special editions of the Bible and religious works, which he printed for free distribution. These included:

1. The Holy Bible, arranged in numbered paragraphs, 1863, 4to, 1272 pages, with an excellent index in a separate volume of 277 pages. Two subsequent editions were printed in 1878 and 1886.
2. Diodati's Italian Testament, similarly arranged and indexed, printed for distribution in Italy.
3. Ostervald's French Testament, arranged on a similar plan.
4. Hymns of the Church Universal, with Prefaces, Annotations, and Indexes, Manchester, 1885, pp. 604, royal 8vo; a selection from a collection made by Rylands of sixty thousand hymns.

=== Marriages and death ===
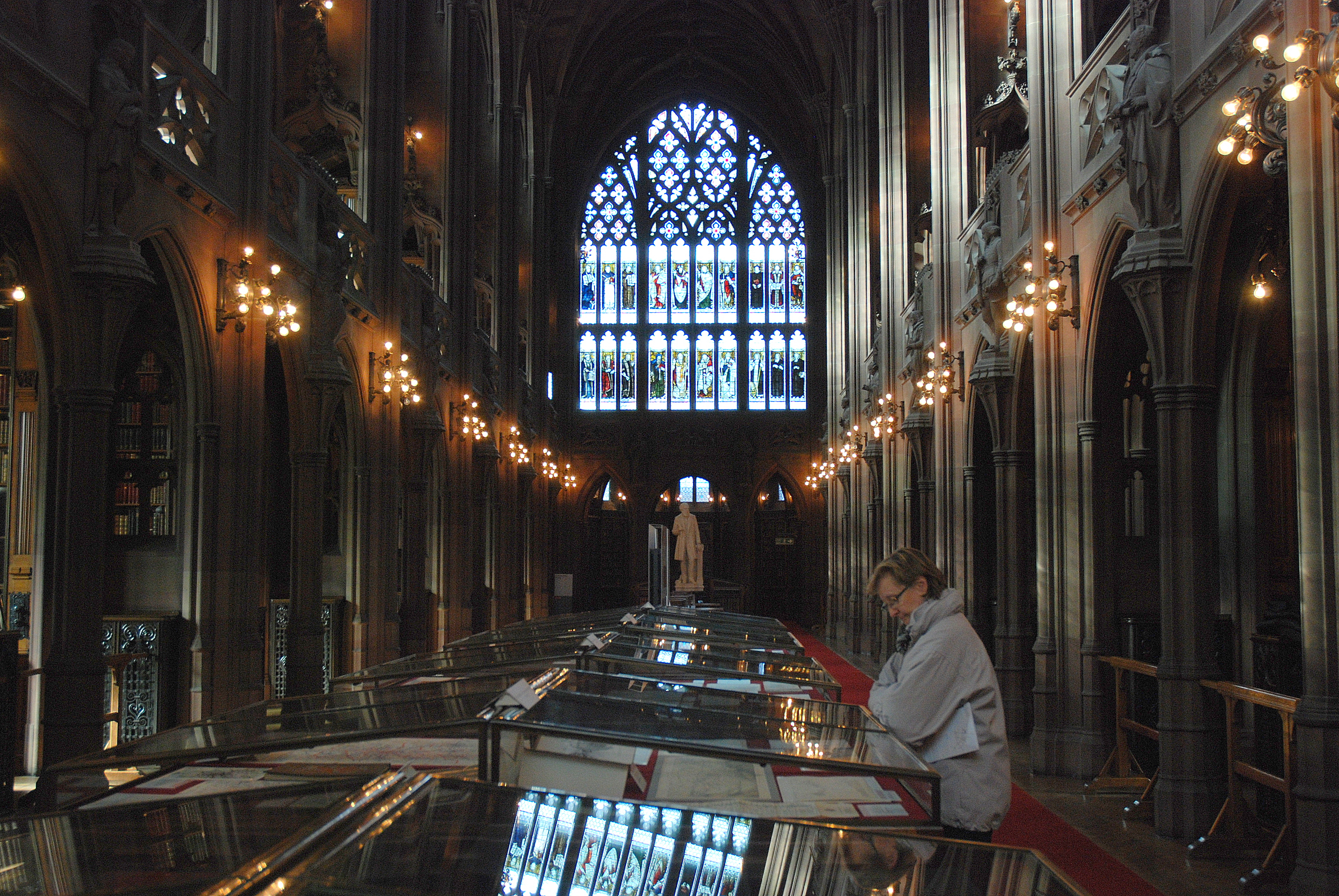
The historic reading room of the John Rylands library looking west (statue of John Rylands by John Cassidy in distance)

He married three times: first, in 1825, Dinah, daughter of W. Raby of Ardwick, Manchester (by her he had six children, none of whom survived him); secondly, in 1848, Martha, widow of Richard Carden; and, thirdly, in 1875, Enriqueta Augustina, the eldest surviving daughter of Stephen Cattley Tennant.

Rylands's widow erected in Manchester a permanent memorial of her husband in the John Rylands Library, of which the famous Althorp Library, purchased by her from Earl Spencer in 1892, and Lord Crawford's manuscripts, purchased by her in 1901, form part of the contents. The library was inaugurated on 6 October 1899, when Mrs Rylands received the Freedom of the City of Manchester. The first day of opening was 1 January 1900. A posthumous grant of arms to John Rylands was obtained in 1893 in which the arms of Tennant are impaled with those of Rylands.

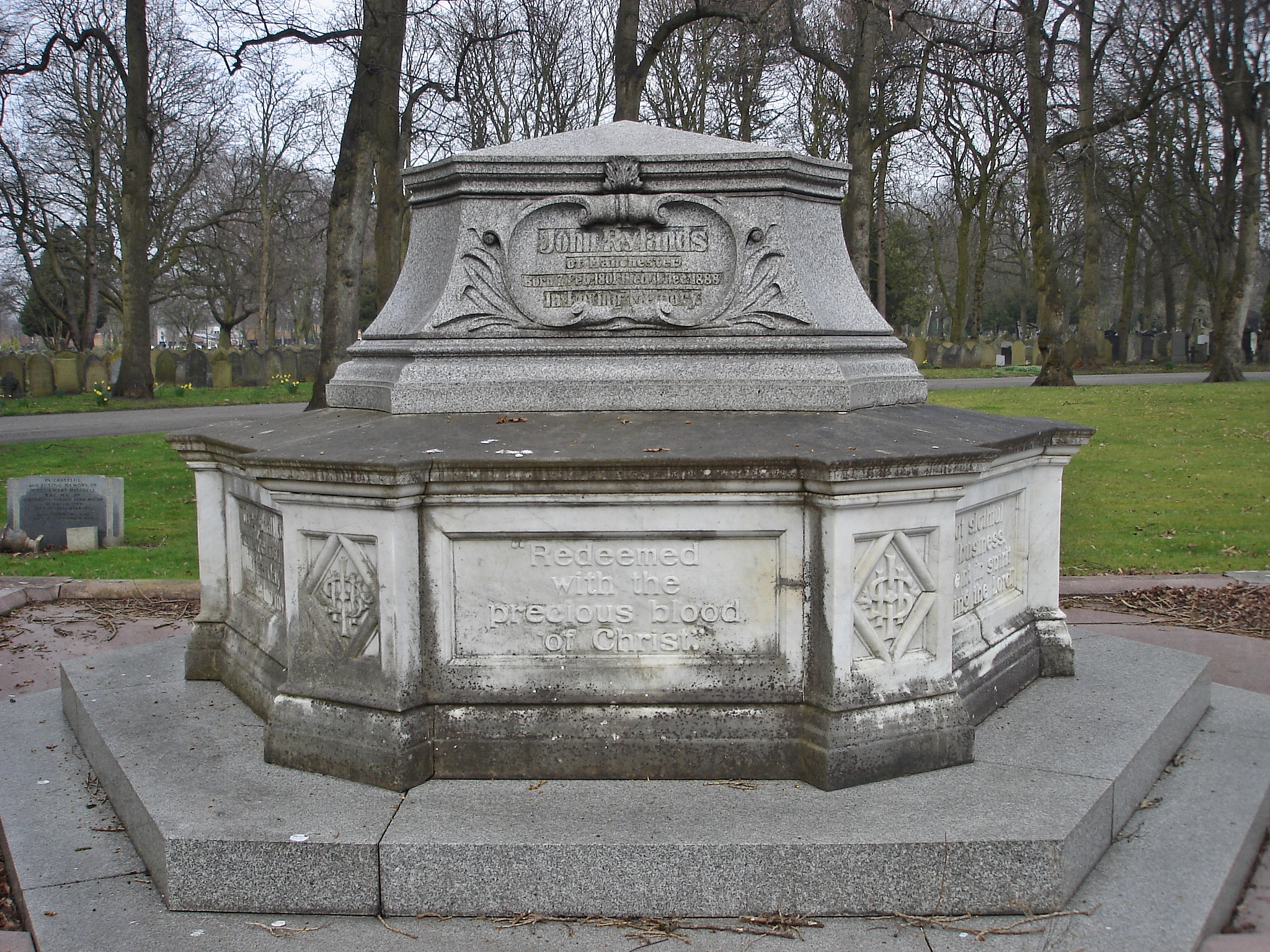
Tomb of John Rylands and his third wife at Southern Cemetery, Manchester

Rylands died at his home, Longford Hall, on 11 December 1888, at the age of 87. He was buried in the Southern Cemetery, Manchester: a fine tomb was erected over the vault and his widow was buried there in 1908. The tomb was designed by C. H. Heathcote and completed in 1892. The elaborate superstructure of the tomb included four angels playing golden trumpets. It was taken down in 1927 after the gold attracted vandals. In 1967, the bronze railings were stolen.

The tomb has several Bible texts inscribed upon it which reflect his deep Christian faith: 1. "Redeemed with the precious blood of Christ." (1 Peter 1:18–19) 2. "They shall be mine saith the Lord of Hosts In that day when I make up my jewels." (Malachi 3:17) 3. "Looking for the mercy of our Lord Jesus Christ unto eternal life." (Jude 1:21) 4. "Kept by the power of God through faith unto salvation." (1 Peter 1:5) 5. "The Lord stood with me and strengthened me." (2 Timothy 4:17). 6. "Not slothful in business, fervent in spirit serving the Lord." (Romans 12:11).

His estate, the bulk of which was left to his wife Enriqueta, was valued at £2,574,922 (£289 million as of 2025), greater than that left by any other cotton manufacturer to that time.

== See also ==
- Rylands v Fletcher, an important case in the law of tort
