= Papyrus Oxyrhynchus 62 =

Third century Greek manuscript

Papyrus Oxyrhynchus 62 (P. Oxy. 62) is a letter from a centurion, written in Greek. The manuscript was written on papyrus in the form of a sheet. It was discovered by Grenfell and Hunt in 1897 in Oxyrhynchus. The document was written on 6 January 222. Currently it is housed in the Bodleian Library (Ms. Gr. Class. d 61) in Oxford. The text was published by Grenfell and Hunt in 1898.

The letter was addressed to Syrus, acting strategus of Oxyrhynchus, by a centurion of unknown name. It concerns a shipment of wheat. The recto side of the papyrus contains a description of a judicial process, but it is too mutilated to read. The measurements of the fragment are 260 by 72 mm.

The verso side was written after 246 CE.

== See also ==
- Oxyrhynchus Papyri
- Papyrus Oxyrhynchus 61
- Papyrus Oxyrhynchus 63
