= Papyrus Oxyrhynchus 60 =

Ancient Greek manuscript

Papyrus Oxyrhynchus 60 (P. Oxy. 60) is a letter addressed to the council of Oxyrhynchus, written by the strategus Hermias, in Greek. The manuscript was written on papyrus in the form of a sheet. It was discovered by Grenfell and Hunt in 1897 in Oxyrhynchus. The document was written on 17 August 323. Currently it is housed in the Library of the Trinity College (Pap. D 1) in Dublin. The text was published by Grenfell and Hunt in 1898.

In the letter, Hermias notifies the council that a supply of meat has been sent to Nicopolis to feed troops stationed there. The measurements of the fragment are 248 by 123 mm.

== See also ==
- Oxyrhynchus Papyri
- Papyrus Oxyrhynchus 59
- Papyrus Oxyrhynchus 61
