= John Cassidy (artist) =

Irish artist and sculptor (1860–1939)

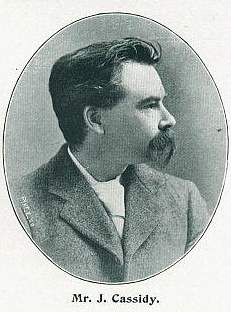
- 1899 photograph of John Cassidy
- Born: 1 January 1860
- Died: 19 July 1939 (aged 79); St Joseph's Hospital, Whalley Range, Manchester
- Resting place: Southern Cemetery, Manchester
- Education: Manchester School of Art
- Known for: Statue of Edward Colston
- Movement: New Sculpture
- Website: johncassidy.org.uk

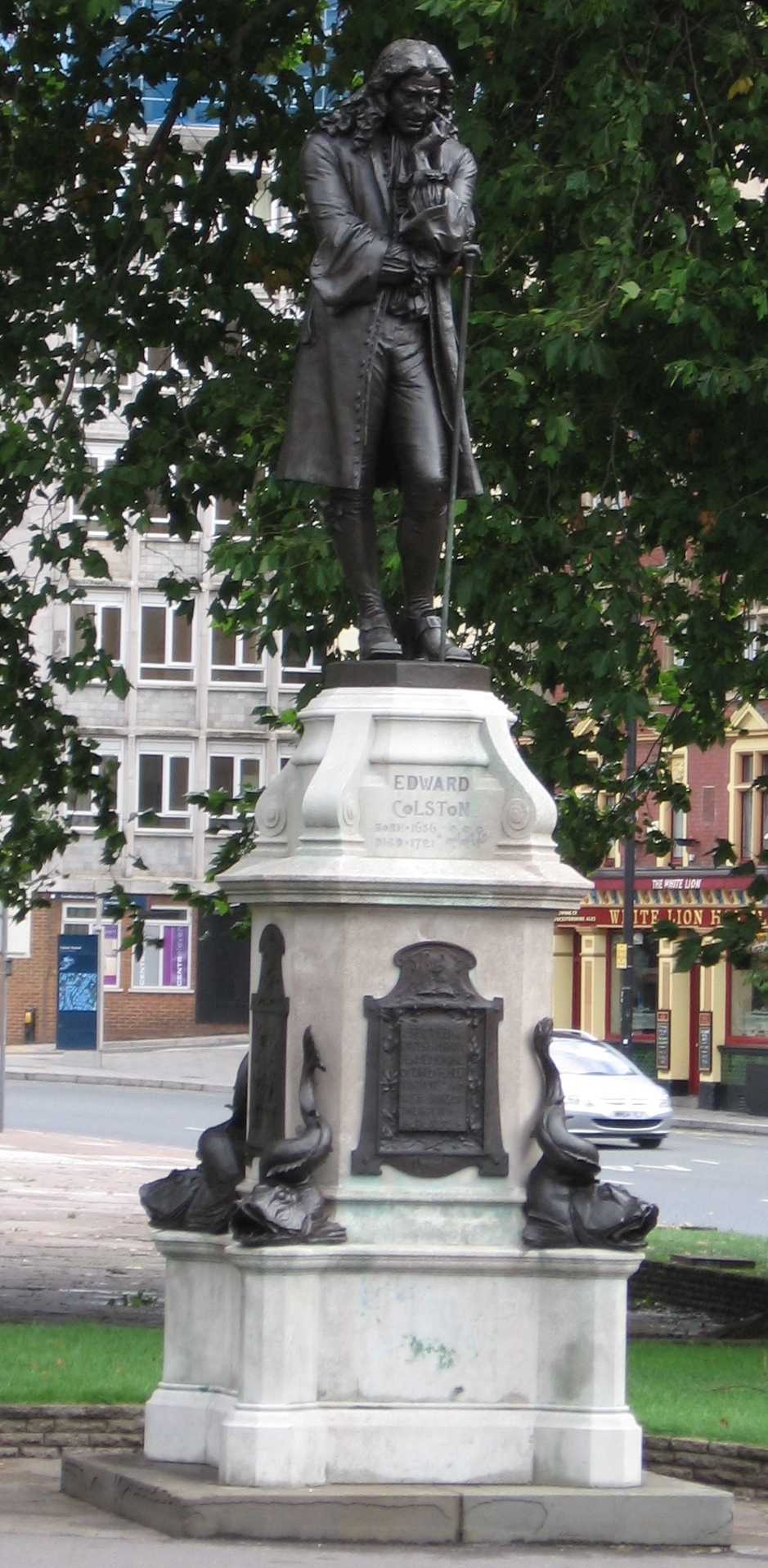
Statue of Edward Colston by Cassidy, The Centre, Bristol, England, 2006, pulled down and pushed into Bristol Harbour in June 2020

John Cassidy (1 January 1860 – 19 July 1939) was an Irish sculptor and painter who worked in Manchester, England, and created many public sculptures.

== Life ==
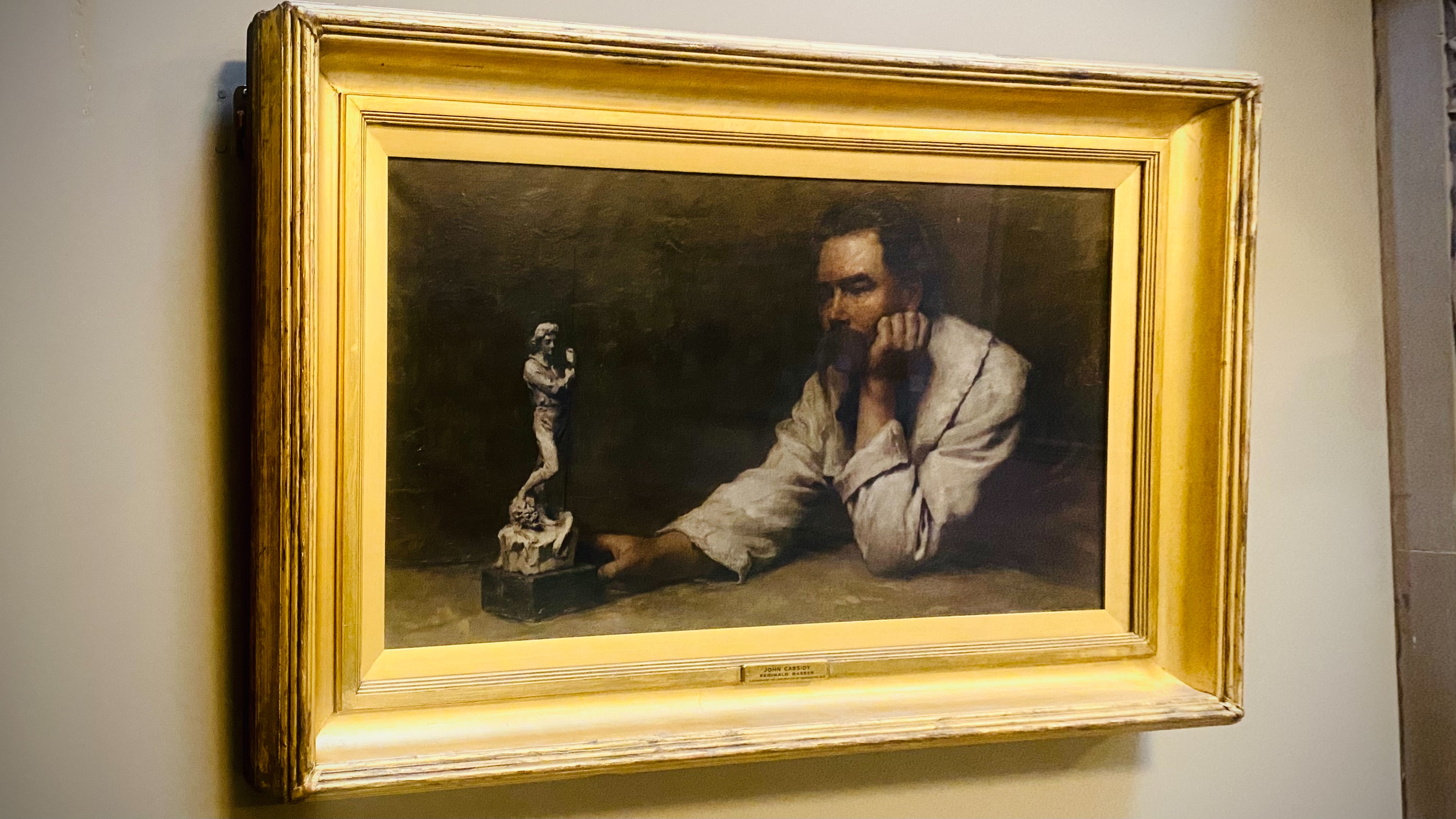
1910 portrait of John Cassidy by Reginald Barber in the Manchester Art Gallery

Cassidy was born in the townland of Littlewood Commons, Slane, County Meath, Ireland, on 1 January 1860. He moved to Dublin at the age of 20 to find work. There he attended art classes at night and won a scholarship to study in Milan, Italy. After two years, he moved to Manchester, England, where he lived for the rest of his life. He studied at the Manchester School of Art in 1883 and taught there in 1887.

He created many public sculptures, especially war memorials, and exhibited at the Royal Academy, the Royal Hibernian Academy and in Manchester City Art Gallery. He was for a time assisted in his studios by John Ashton Floyd, a local sculptor. For most of his career, his studio was at Lincoln Grove in Chorlton-on-Medlock.

== Works ==
The body of Cassidy's work consisted mainly of memorials and statues.

In 1894, the philanthropist Enriqueta Rylands commissioned a statue from Cassidy of her late husband, the textile manufacturer John Rylands. It was placed in the reading room of the John Rylands Library in Manchester, which she founded in her husband's memory. Supporters of the library later commissioned Cassidy to sculpt a statue of Enriqueta herself, which was unveiled in 1907. Both statues still stand today at either end of the library reading room, now part of the Manchester University Library. Also within the library is a sculpted group of three figures representing Theology inspiring Science and Art (1898).

The Manchester Corporation commissioned Cassidy in 1896 to design a large ornamental fountain for Albert Square, Manchester to mark the Diamond Jubilee of Queen Victoria. The hexagonal Jubilee Fountain stood in the square until the 1920s, when it was moved to Heaton Park. In 1997 during renovations and pedestrianisation of Albert Square the fountain was restored to its original location.

Another noted Manchester work is a 1907 bronze sculpture entitled Adrift, depicting a family clinging to a raft in a stormy sea, its style showing the influence of the New Sculpture movement. It was exhibited at the New Gallery in London and then gifted by the Manchester industrialist and art collector James Gresham to the Manchester Corporation, who used it as the centrepiece of the new ornamental Piccadilly Gardens, laid out c.1930. In 1953 it was replaced by a fountain and relocated. Adrift now stands in front of the Manchester Central Library in St Peter's Square.

A public monument in Bristol commissioned in 1895 from Cassidy rose to prominence in 2020. Cassidy's statue of Edward Colston was erected in the area now known as The Centre to celebrate the philanthropy of the merchant Edward Colston, but had come to be considered controversial due to Colston's involvement in the Atlantic slave trade. On 7 June 2020, the Colston statue was pulled from its plinth by Black Lives Matter protestors and pushed into Bristol Harbour. From June 2021 the statue was exhibited at the M Shed museum in Bristol, in damaged and disfigured condition.

Many of Cassidy's surviving works remain in the Manchester district, while other smaller works are held in private collections.

=== Selected works ===
Works by John Cassidy include:

- Adrift, Manchester
- Clayton-le-Moors war memorial
- Duthie Monument, Duthie Park, Aberdeen
- John Kay memorial, Bury, Greater Manchester
- Jubilee Fountain, Albert Square, Manchester
- Sir Benjamin Alfred Dobson statue, Bolton
- Statue of Edward Colston, Bristol
- Statue of Edward VII, Manchester
- Statue of Enriqueta Rylands, John Rylands Library, Manchester
- Statue of John Rylands, John Rylands Library, Manchester
- Bust of Harry Houdini

In the aftermath of World War I, Cassidy was commissioned to sculpt a number of war memorials for towns around Britain, including memorials in Eccles, Heaton Chapel/Heaton Moor, Skipton, Stourbridge and Colwyn Bay.

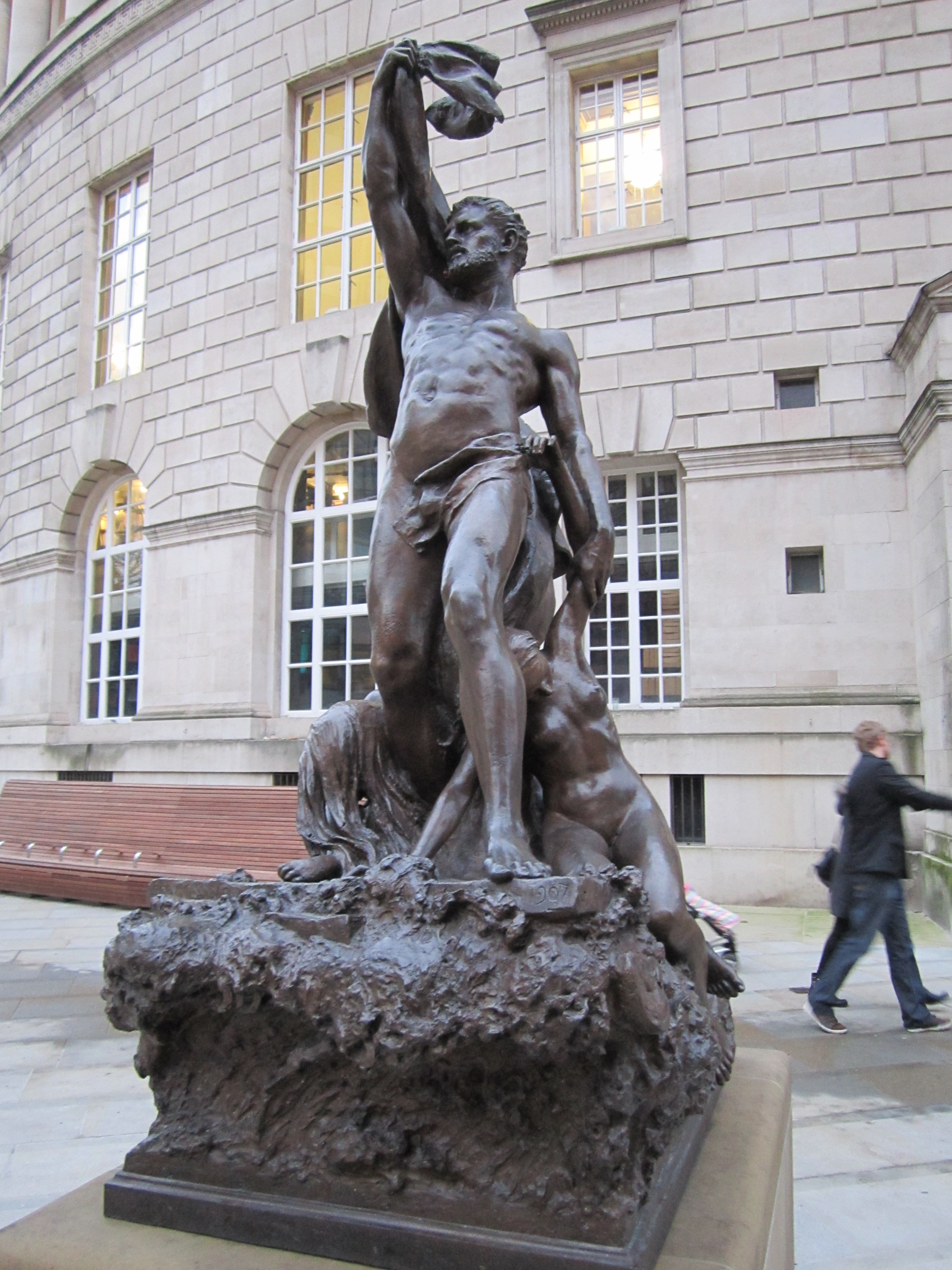
Adrift, Manchester

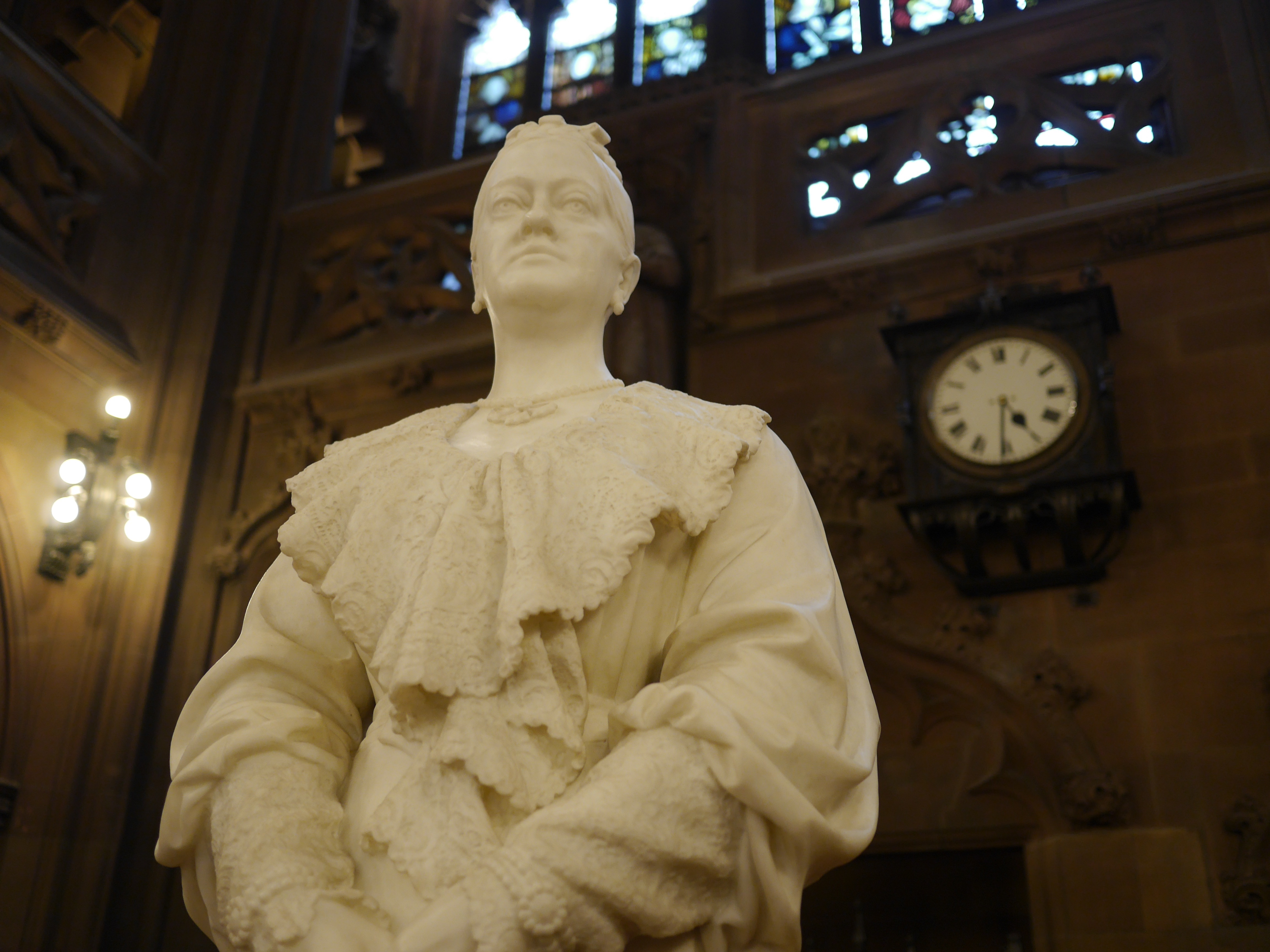
Statue of Enriqueta Rylands (detail), John Rylands Library, Manchester

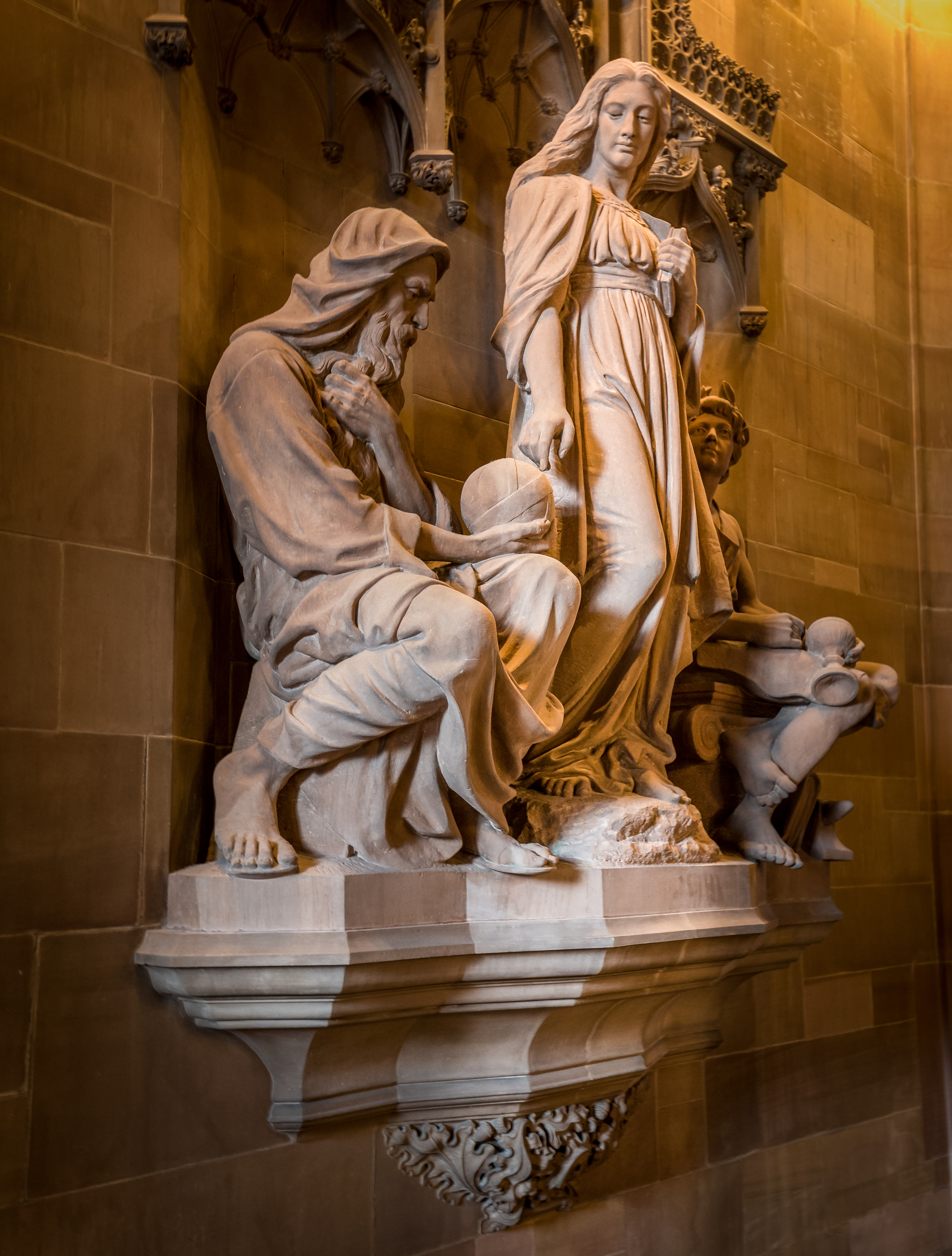
Theology, Science and Art, John Rylands Library, Manchester

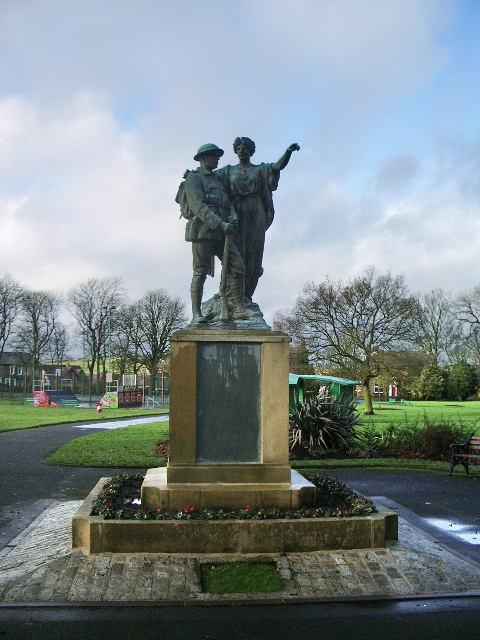
War Memorial, Clayton-le-Moors

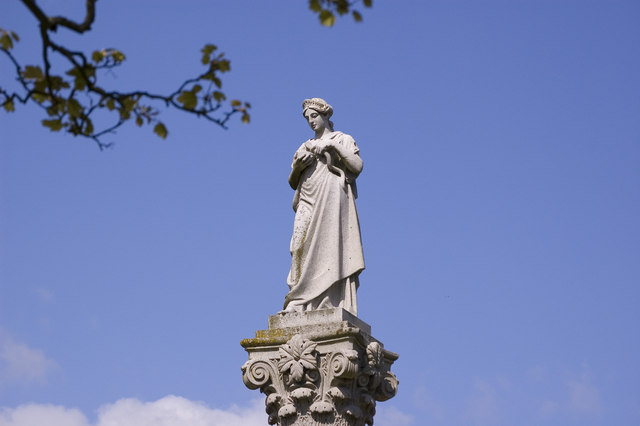
Duthie Monument, Aberdeen

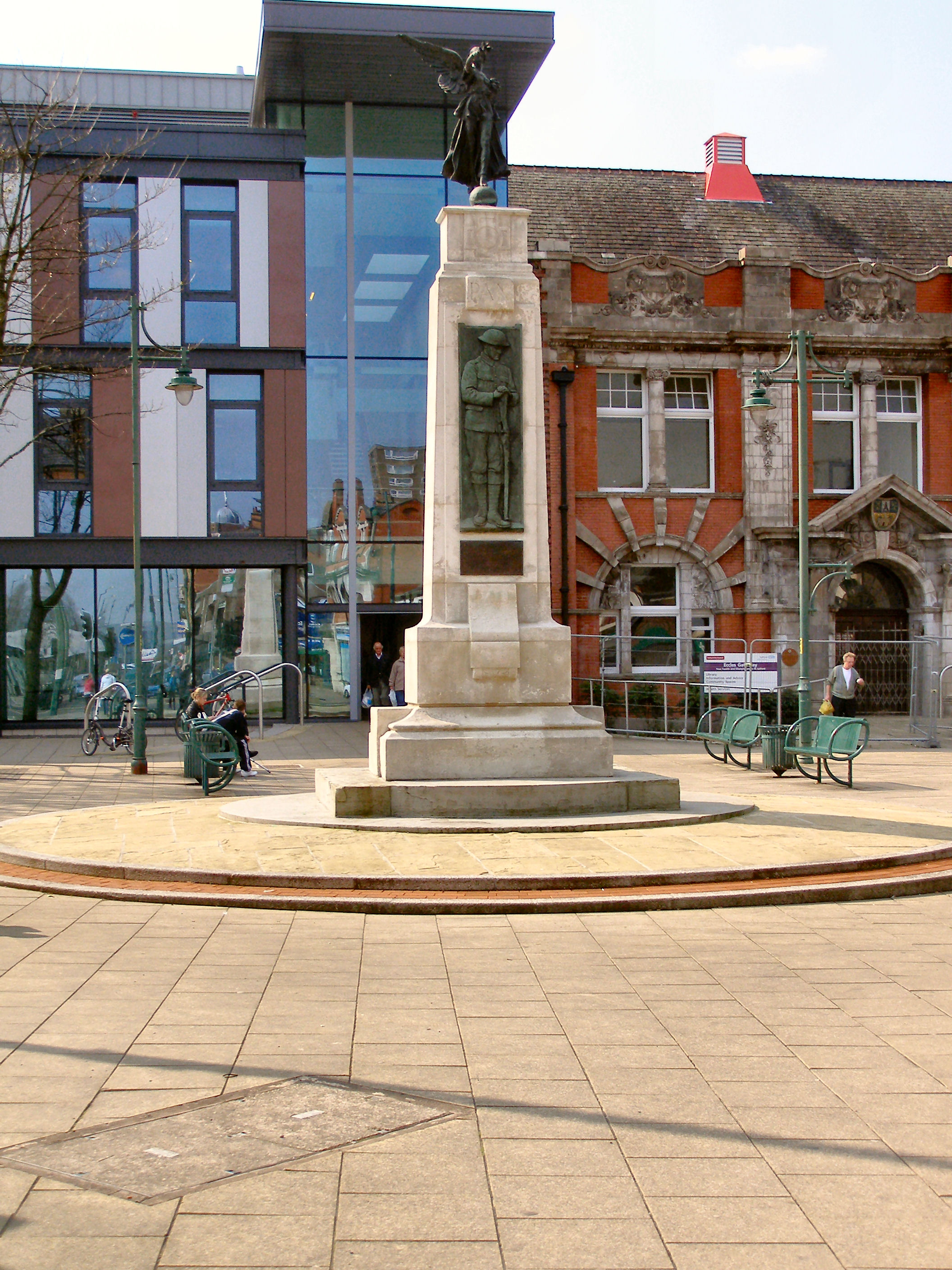
War Memorial, Eccles

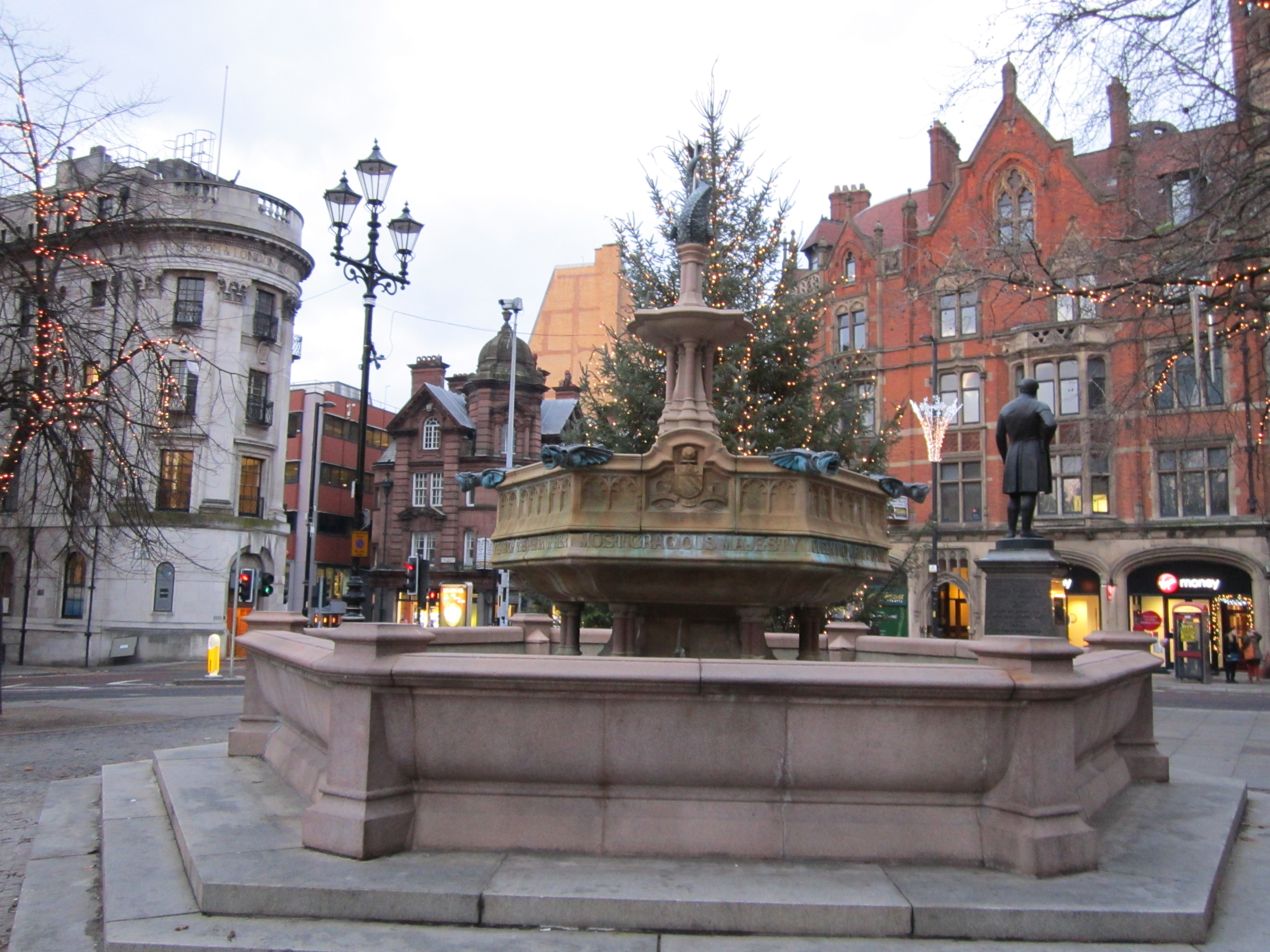
Jubilee Fountain, Albert Square, Manchester

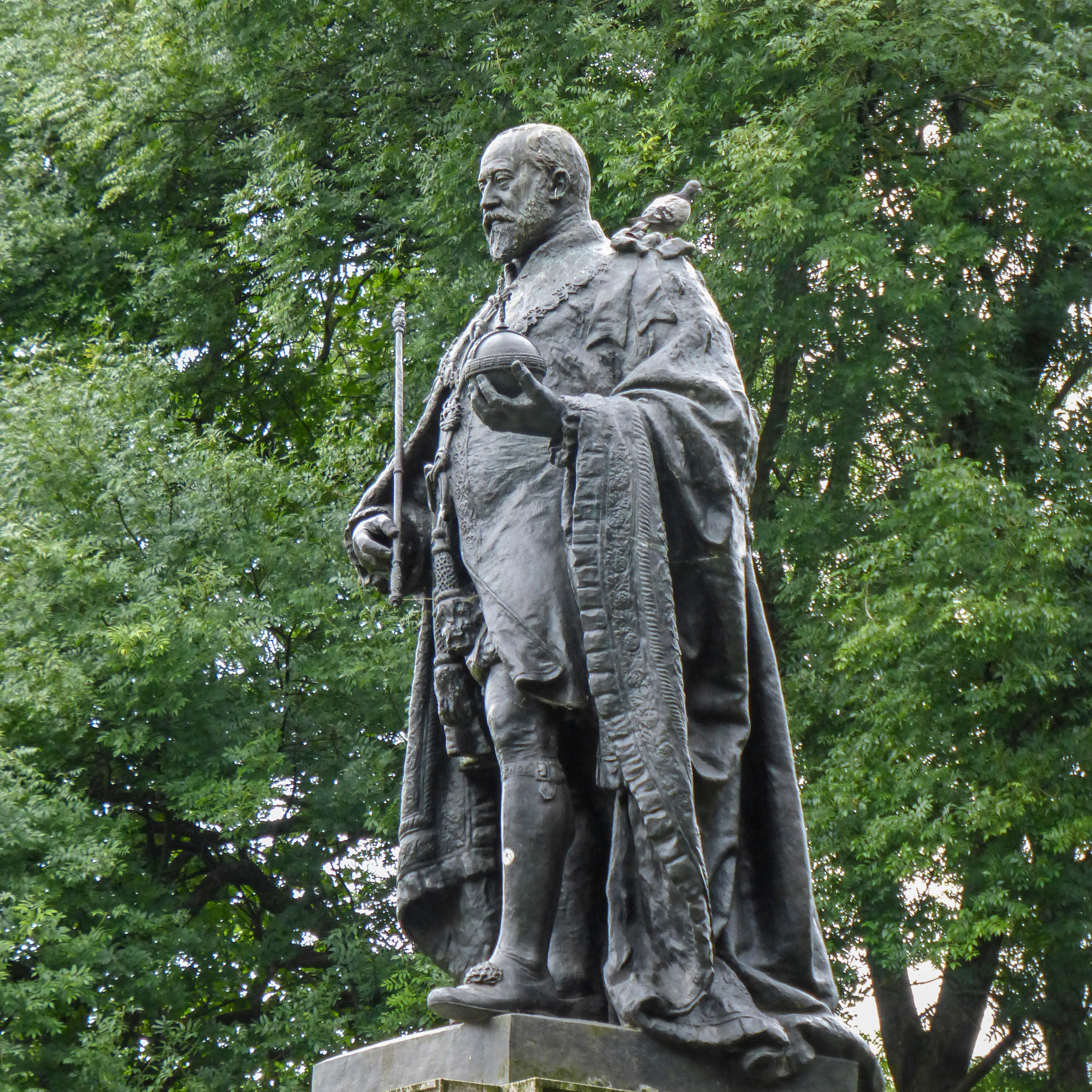
Statue of Edward VII, Manchester

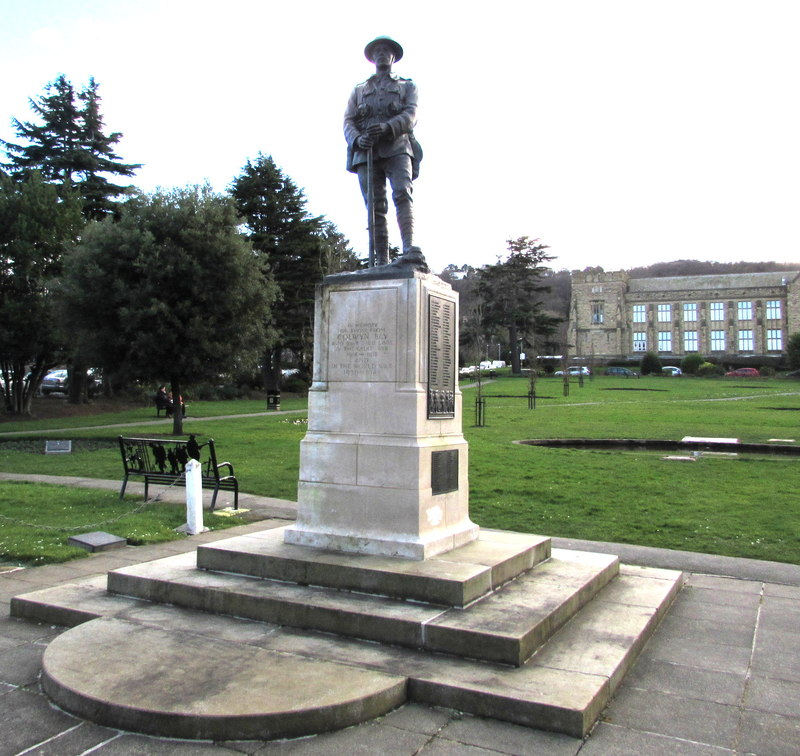
War Memorial, Colwyn Bay

== Death and legacy ==
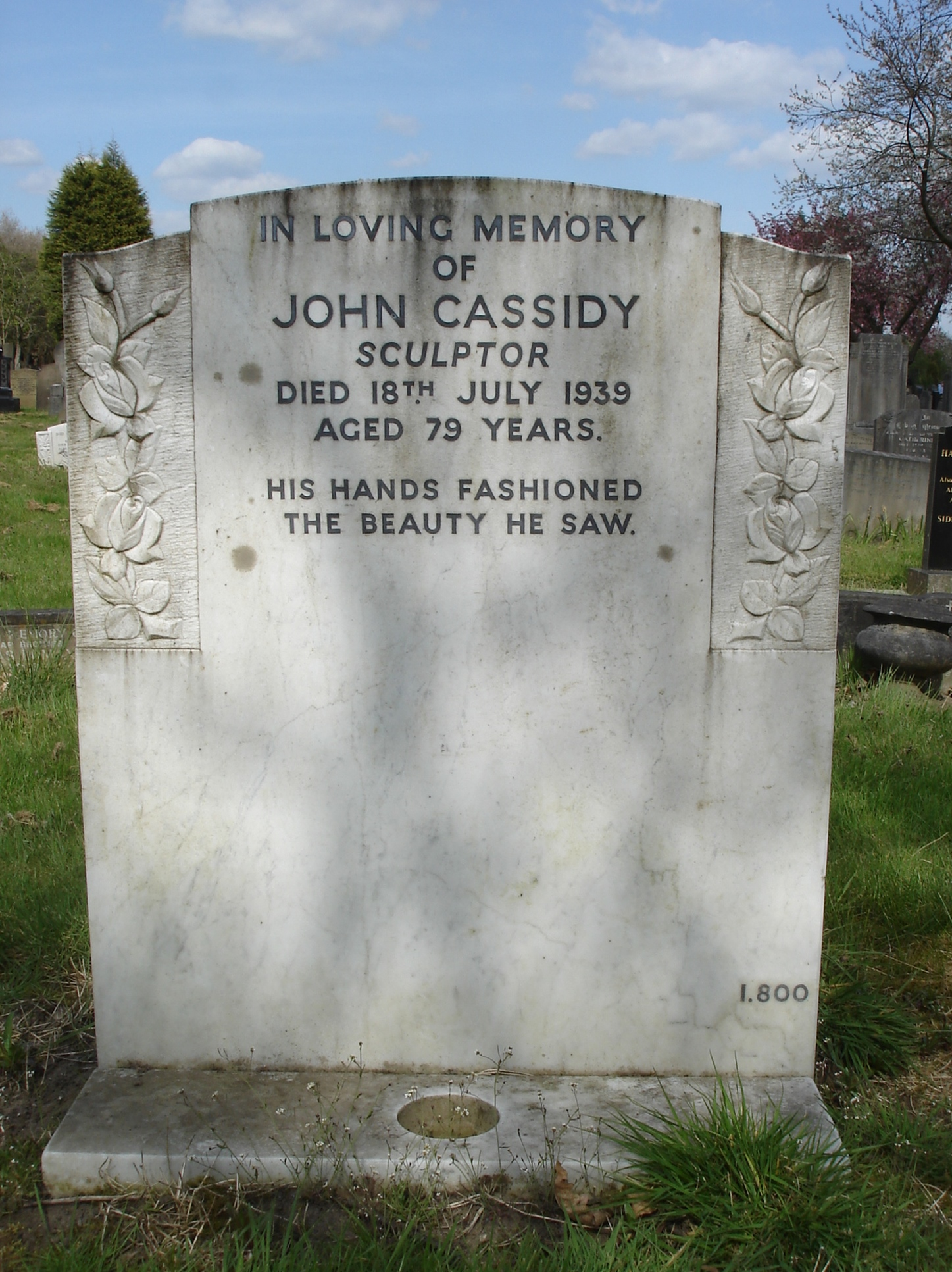
Cassidy's gravestone in Southern Cemetery

At the end of his life, Cassidy was living in Fallowfield in south Manchester, at 10 Albion Road. Suffering from ill health, he was taken to St Joseph's Hospital in Whalley Range. While in hospital, Cassidy continued to sculpt and was working on a bust of Pope Pius XII when he died there on 19 July 1939, aged 79. He was buried in the Roman Catholic section of Manchester's Southern Cemetery. His headstone bears the inscription, "His hands fashioned the beauty he saw".

Many of his public sculptures remain on view in towns and cities around the United Kingdom today. A 1900 portrait of John Cassidy by Reginald Barber is in the collection of Manchester Art Gallery.
