= Papyrus Oxyrhynchus 65 =

Ancient Greek arrest order

Papyrus Oxyrhynchus 65 (P. Oxy. 65) is an order for an arrest, written in Greek. The manuscript was written on papyrus in the form of a sheet. It was discovered by Grenfell and Hunt in 1897 in Oxyrhynchus. The document was written in the third or the early fourth century. Currently it is housed in the University of Pennsylvania (E 2751) in Philadelphia, Pennsylvania. The text was published by Grenfell and Hunt in 1898.

The letter was written by an unnamed beneficiarius to the comarchs of the village of Teruthis, asking them to send up for trial a person named Pachoumis. The measurements of the fragment are 100 by 251 mm.

== See also ==
- Oxyrhynchus Papyri
- Papyrus Oxyrhynchus 64
- Papyrus Oxyrhynchus 66
