= John Rylands Research Institute and Library =

Research library in Manchester, England

John Rylands Library
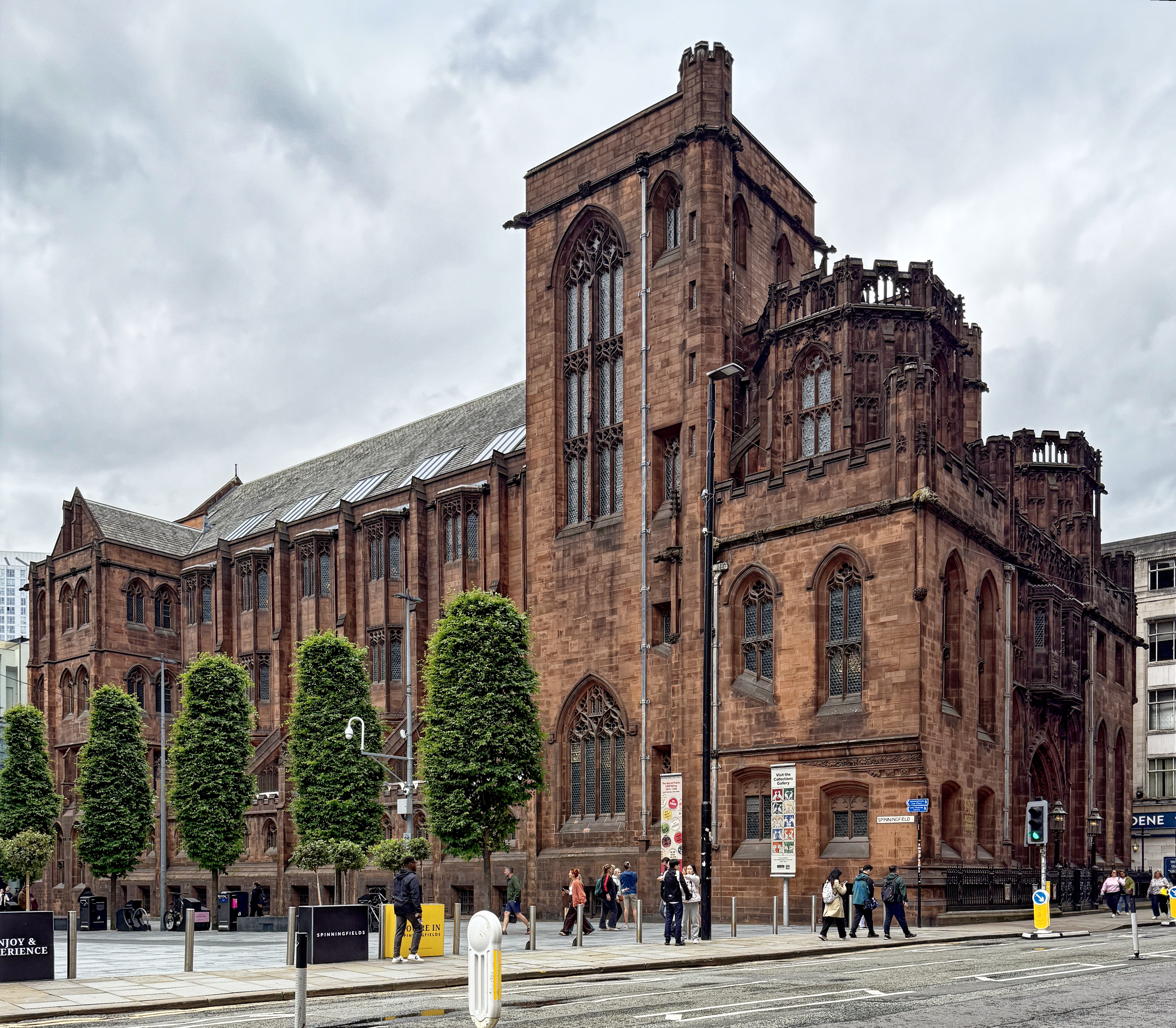
- Alternative names: Rylands

General information
- Type: Library
- Architectural style: Neo-Gothic
- Location: Deansgate, Manchester, England
- Coordinates: 53.480321°N 2.2487°W
- Construction started: 1890
- Completed: 1899
- Opened: 1 January 1900
- Inaugurated: 6 October 1899
- Renovated: 1920, 1962, 2003–07
- Cost: £200,000
- Owner: University of Manchester

Design and construction
- Architect: Basil Champneys
- Main contractor: R. and W. Morrison, Liverpool
- Designations

Listed Building – Grade I
- Official name: John Rylands Library and attached railings, gates and lamp standards
- Designated: 25 January 1952
- Reference no.: 1217800

Website
- Official website

The John Rylands Library is a late-Victorian neo-Gothic building on Deansgate in Manchester, England. It is part of the University of Manchester. The library, which opened to the public in 1900, was founded by Enriqueta Augustina Rylands in memory of her husband, John Rylands. It became part of the university in 1972, and now houses the majority of the Special Collections of The University of Manchester Library, the third largest academic library in the United Kingdom.

Special collections built up by both libraries were progressively concentrated in the Deansgate building. The special collections, believed to be among the largest in the United Kingdom, include medieval illuminated manuscripts and examples of early European printing, including a Gutenberg Bible and a Mainz Psalter, the second largest collection of printing by William Caxton, and the most extensive collection of the editions of the Aldine Press of Venice. The Rylands Library Papyrus P52 has a claim to be the earliest extant New Testament text. The library holds personal papers and letters of notable figures, among them the novelist Elizabeth Gaskell and the scientist John Dalton.

The architectural style is primarily neo-Gothic with elements of the Arts and Crafts movement in the ornate and imposing gatehouse, facing Deansgate, which dominates the streetscape. The library, granted Grade I listed status in 1994, is maintained by the University of Manchester and open for library readers and visitors.

The library is one of the museum, library and archive collections of national and international importance under the Designation Scheme for England. As of 2020, 152 collections are officially designated.

== History ==
Enriqueta Rylands purchased a site on Deansgate for her memorial library in 1889 and commissioned a design from architect Basil Champneys. Mrs Rylands commissioned the Manchester academic Alice Cooke to index the vast library of the 2nd Earl Spencer which she had purchased and another collection of autographs. Mrs Rylands intended the library to be principally theological, and the building, which is a fine example of Victorian Gothic, has the appearance of a church, although the concept was of an Oxford college library on a larger scale. Champneys presented plans to Mrs Rylands within a week of gaining the commission. Thereafter frequent disagreements arose and Mrs Rylands selected decorative elements, window glass and statues against his wishes.

Champneys was given the honour of speaking about the library at a general meeting of the Royal Institute of British Architects and was awarded a Royal Gold Medal in 1912. The library was granted listed building status on 25 January 1952, which was upgraded to Grade I on 6 June 1994.

The core of the library's collection was formed around 40,000 books, including many rarities, assembled by George Spencer, 2nd Earl Spencer, which Mrs Rylands purchased from Lord Spencer in 1892 for £210,000. She had begun acquiring books in 1889 and continued to do so throughout her lifetime. Another notable purchase made by Mrs Rylands was that of over 6,000 manuscripts from the Bibliotheca Lindesiana of James Lindsay, 26th Earl of Crawford at Haigh Hall in 1901. Quickly and without discussion, Mrs Rylands took them off his hands for £155,000, having made her decision based upon cursory description, as Lord Crawford had never produced a definitive description.

After its inauguration on 6 October 1899 (the wedding anniversary of John Rylands and Enriqueta Tennant), the library opened to readers and visitors on 1 January 1900. At the time of Enriqueta's death in 1908, the library held more than 50,000 volumes of exceptional quality. In the following years, thanks to bequests, the library acquired 80,000 works and 3,000 manuscripts, which required the construction of an annex behind the main building.

The John Rylands Library and the Manchester University Library merged in July 1972 and was named the John Rylands University Library of Manchester. Special collections built up by both libraries were progressively concentrated in the Deansgate building.

The building has been extended four times, the first time to designs by Champneys in 1920 after the project was delayed by the First World War. The Lady Wolfson Building opened in 1962 on the west side and a third extension, south of the first was built in 1969. In January 2003, an appeal to renovate the building was launched. Funds were generated from grants from the University of Manchester and Heritage Lottery Fund and donations from members of the public and companies in Manchester. The project, "Unlocking the Rylands", demolished the third extension, refurbished parts of the old building and erected a pitched roof over its reinforced concrete roof. Champneys designed a pitched roof but Mrs Rylands was advised that an internal stone vault would reduce the fire risk and it was not built. The £17 million project was completed by summer 2007 and the library reopened on 20 September 2007.

A £7.6 million plan to upgrade the library was issued in February 2024 under which Manchester City Council allowed a series of "sensitive adaptations" to update The John Rylands Library. The project 'John Rylands Next Chapter' was a part of its Imagine2030 vision.

== Location ==
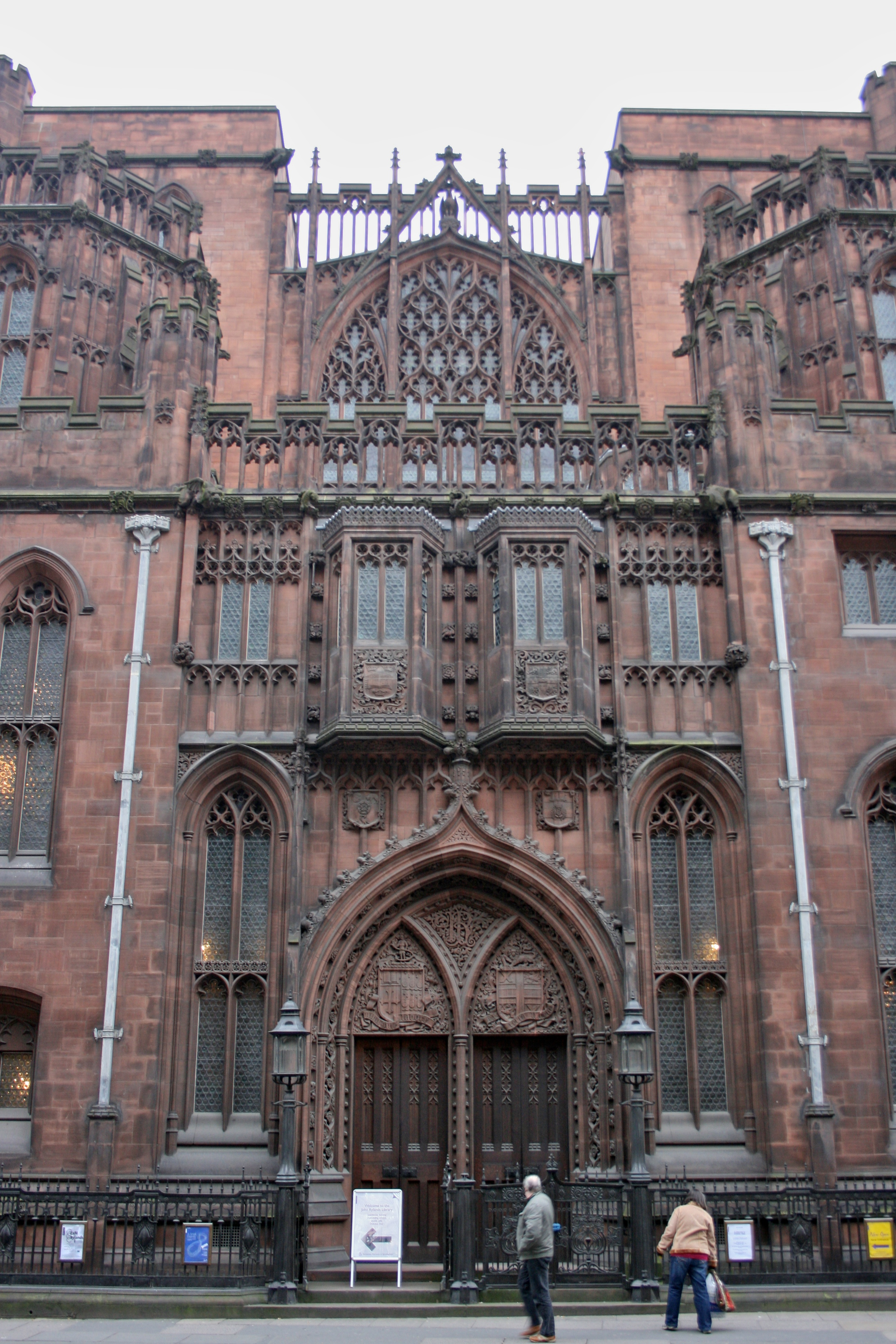
Facade of the John Rylands Library

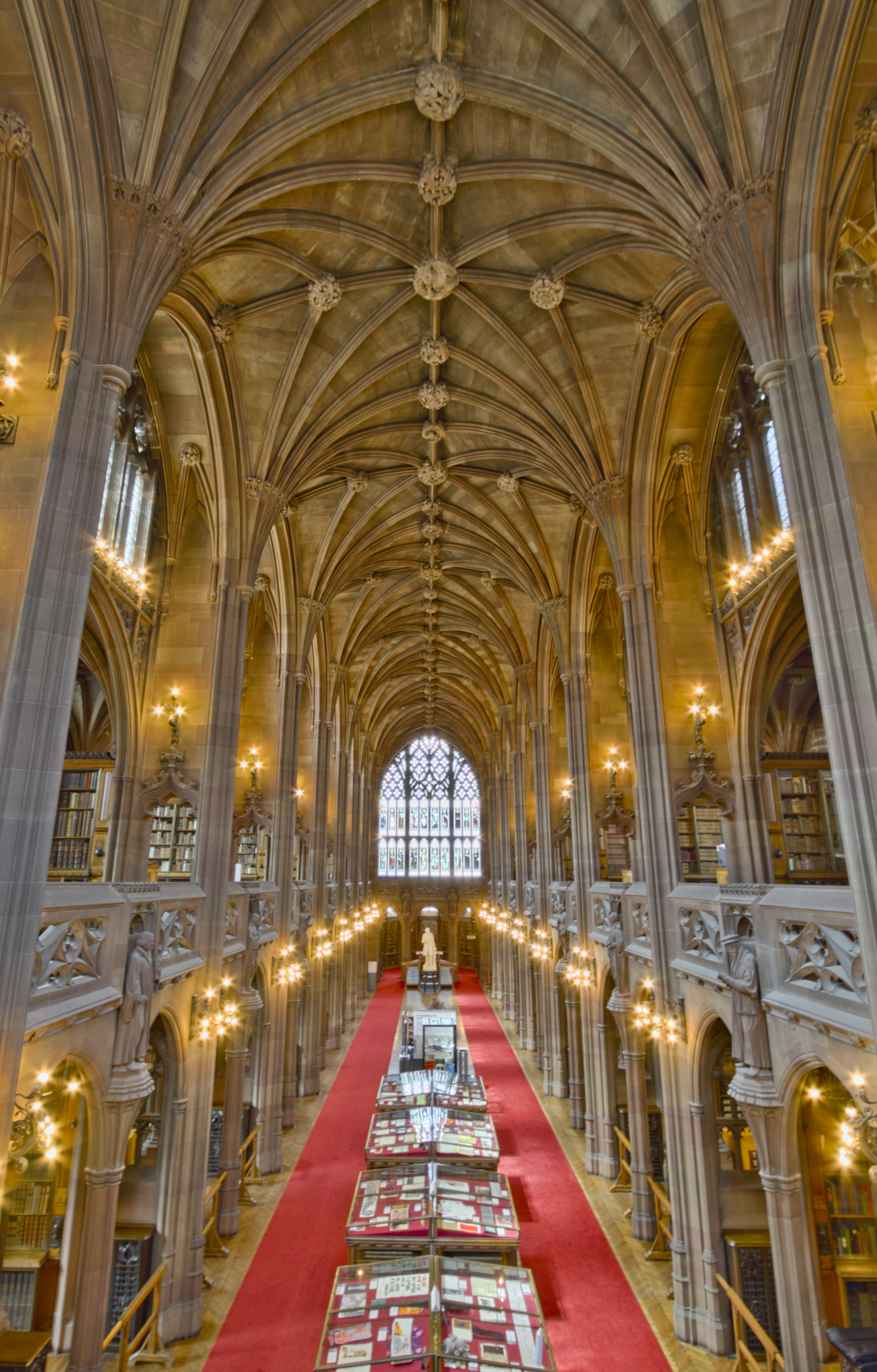
Reading Room of the Rylands Library

By the nineteenth century Manchester was a prosperous industrial town and the demands of cotton manufacturing stimulated the growth of engineering and chemical industries. The town became 'abominably filthy' and was 'often covered, especially during the winter, with dense fogs ... there is at all times a copious descent of soots and other impurities'. This, and the overcrowded site, created many design problems for the architect. During the century most textile manufacture moved to newer mills in the surrounding towns while Manchester remained the centre of trading in cotton goods both for the home and foreign markets but pollution from burning coal and gas remained a considerable nuisance.

The site chosen by Mrs Rylands was in a central and fashionable part of the city, but was awkward in shape and orientation and surrounded by tall warehouses, derelict cottages and narrow streets. The position was criticised for its lack of surrounding space and the fact that the valuable manuscript collections were to be housed in "that dirty, uncomfortable city ... [with] not enough light to read by, and the books they already have are wretchedly kept" (written in 1901 about the Crawford MSS.) Mrs Rylands negotiated Deeds of Agreement with her neighbours to fix the heights of future adjacent buildings. The permissible height of the building was fixed at just over 34 feet, but it was suggested that it could be taller at the centre if there was an open area around the edges, at the height of buildings that had been demolished to make way for the construction. Champneys incorporated this suggestion into his design, setting the two towers of the façade twelve feet back from the boundary and keeping the entrance block low, to allow light into the library. He designed the building in a series of tiered steps with an almost flat roof to give a 'liberal concession' to the neighbours' 'right to light'.

== Architecture ==
=== Exterior ===
The library was built on a rectangular plan and subsequent extensions are to the rear. It was designed to resemble a church in a decorated neo-Gothic style with Arts and Crafts details. It is constructed of Cumbrian sandstone, the interior a delicately shaded 'Shawk' stone (from Dalston, varying in colour between sand and a range of pinks) and the exterior, dark red Barbary stone from Penrith. built around an internal steel framed structure and brick arched flooring. The red 'Barbary plain' sandstone, which Champneys believed 'had every chance of proving durable' for the exterior, was an unusual choice in late Victorian Manchester. It proved relatively successful, as an inspection by Champneys in 1900 revealed little softening by the 'effects of an atmosphere somewhat charged with chemicals' although, by 1909 some repairs were needed.

The library has a crypt above which the building has two unequal storeys giving the impression of three. The ornate Deansgate façade has an embattled parapet with open-work arcading under which is a central three-bay entrance resembling a monastery gatehouse. Its two-centred arched portal has doorways separated by a trumeau and tall windows on either side. Above the doors are a pair of small canted oriel windows. Surfaces are decorated with lacy blind tracery and finely detailed carving. The carving includes the "J. R." monogram, the arms of Rylands, the arms of St Helens (Rylands' native town), and those of five English, two Scottish and two Irish universities and of Owens College. On either side of the entrance portal are square two-storey two-bay wings with plain walls with a string course containing grotesques and large octagonal lanterns. Behind the entrance portal flanked by square towers is the three-light east window of the reading hall. It has reticulated tracery and shafts in a similar style to the parapet. In front of the library are Art Nouveau bronze railings with central double gates and lamp standards.

=== Interior ===
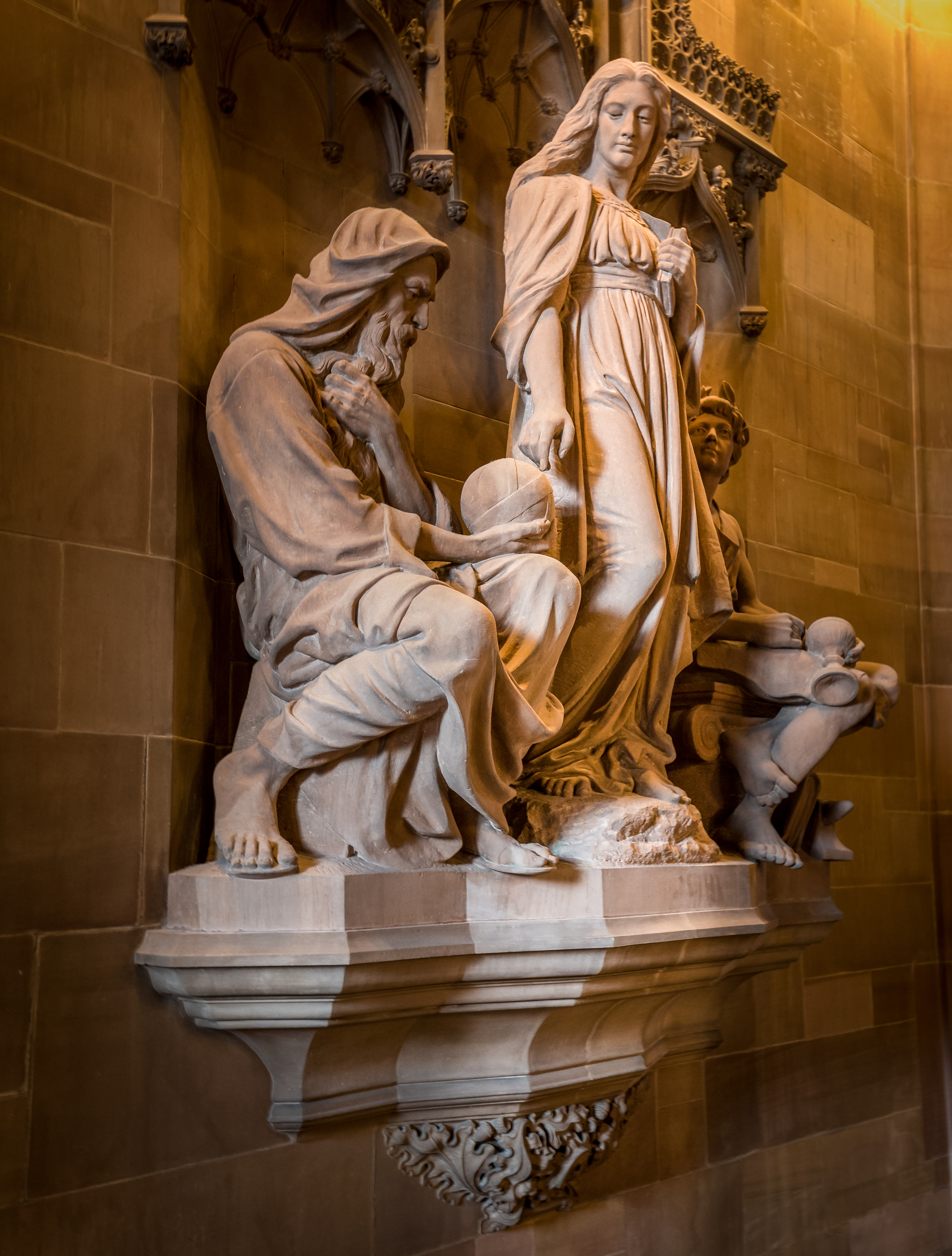
Theology, Science and Art; by John Cassidy; in the vestibule

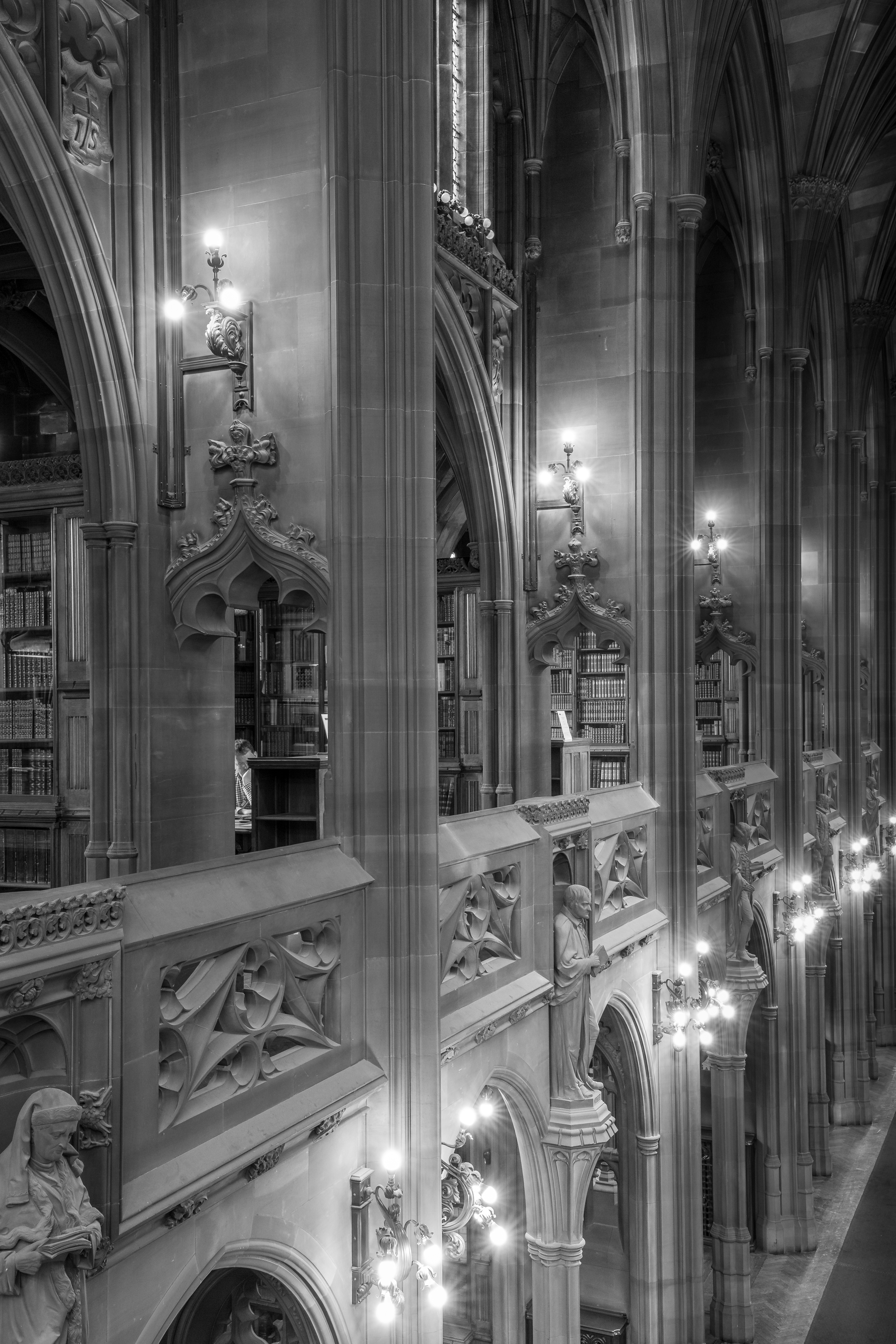
Part of the gallery with some of the portraits in sculpture

The main reading room on the first floor, 30 feet above the ground and 12 feet from all four boundaries, was noted for the pleasant contrast between the 'sullen roar' of Manchester and the 'internal cloister quietude of Rylands'. It was lit by oriel windows in the reading alcoves supplemented by high clerestory windows along both sides. Embellishments in the reading room include two large stained-glass windows with portraits of religious and secular figures, designed by C. E. Kempe; a series of statues in the reading room by Robert Bridgeman and Sons of Lichfield; and bronze work in the art nouveau style by Singer of Frome. The portraits in sculpture (20) and stained glass (40) represent a selection of personages from the intellectual and artistic history of mankind. The western window contains "Theology" from Moses to Schleiermacher; the eastern "Literature and Art" (including philosophy). The portrait statues of John and Enriqueta Rylands in white marble, in the reading room, were sculpted by John Cassidy who also executed the allegorical group of 'Theology, Science and Art' in the vestibule.

Aside from the main library and reading room with gallery above, the design incorporated Bible and map rooms on the first floor, and conference (lecture) and committee rooms on the ground floor, part of which was intended to be a lending library but never operated as such. A caretaker's house was incorporated in the building until it was demolished for the extension of 1969. The timber used for the woodwork in the principal rooms was Dantzig oak.

=== Technology ===
Electric lighting was chosen as the cleanest and safest alternative to gas but, as the use of electricity was in its early stages, the supply (110 volts DC) was generated on-site. This took some years to achieve due to the inexperience of contractors, but the library became one of the first public buildings in Manchester to be lit by electricity and continued to generate its own supply until 1950.

Champneys suggested that, in order to protect the books and manuscripts, 'it will be very desirable to keep the air in the interior of the building as clear and free from smoke and chemical matter (both of which are held in the air of Manchester) as may be possible'. The ground floor was built with numerous air inlets and, although his client felt it would prove impossible to exclude foul air, Champneys installed jute or hessian screens to trap the soot, with water sprays to catch the sulphur and other chemicals, which was a very advanced system for the period. Internal screen doors were employed in the entrance hall to prevent the air being 'fouled by the opening of the outer doors' with internal swing doors between the circulation areas and the main library to 'preserve the valuable books from injury'. By 1900 the ventilation system had evolved to include electric fans to draw in air at pavement level through coke screens sprayed with water.

== Collections ==
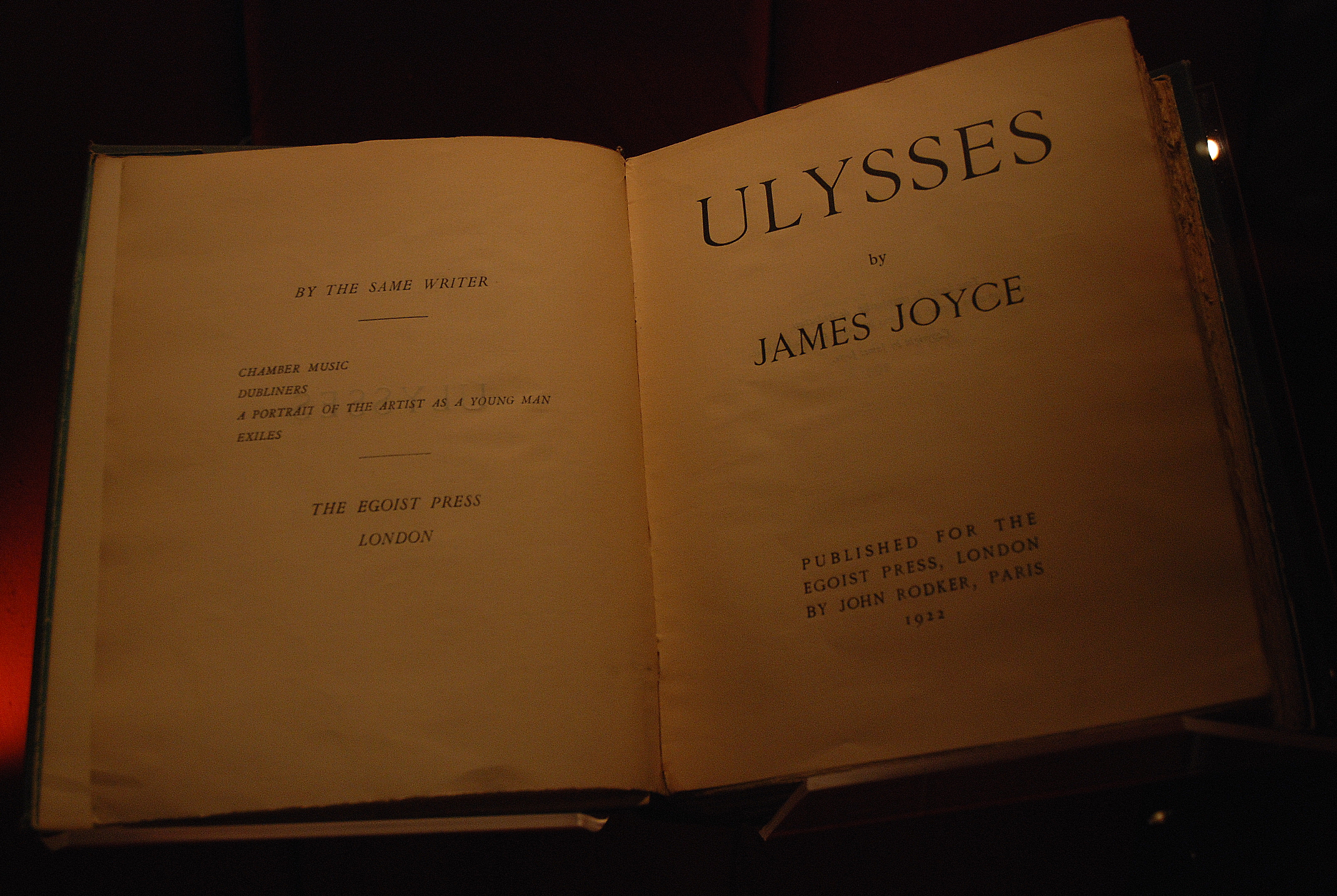
First edition of Ulysses by James Joyce

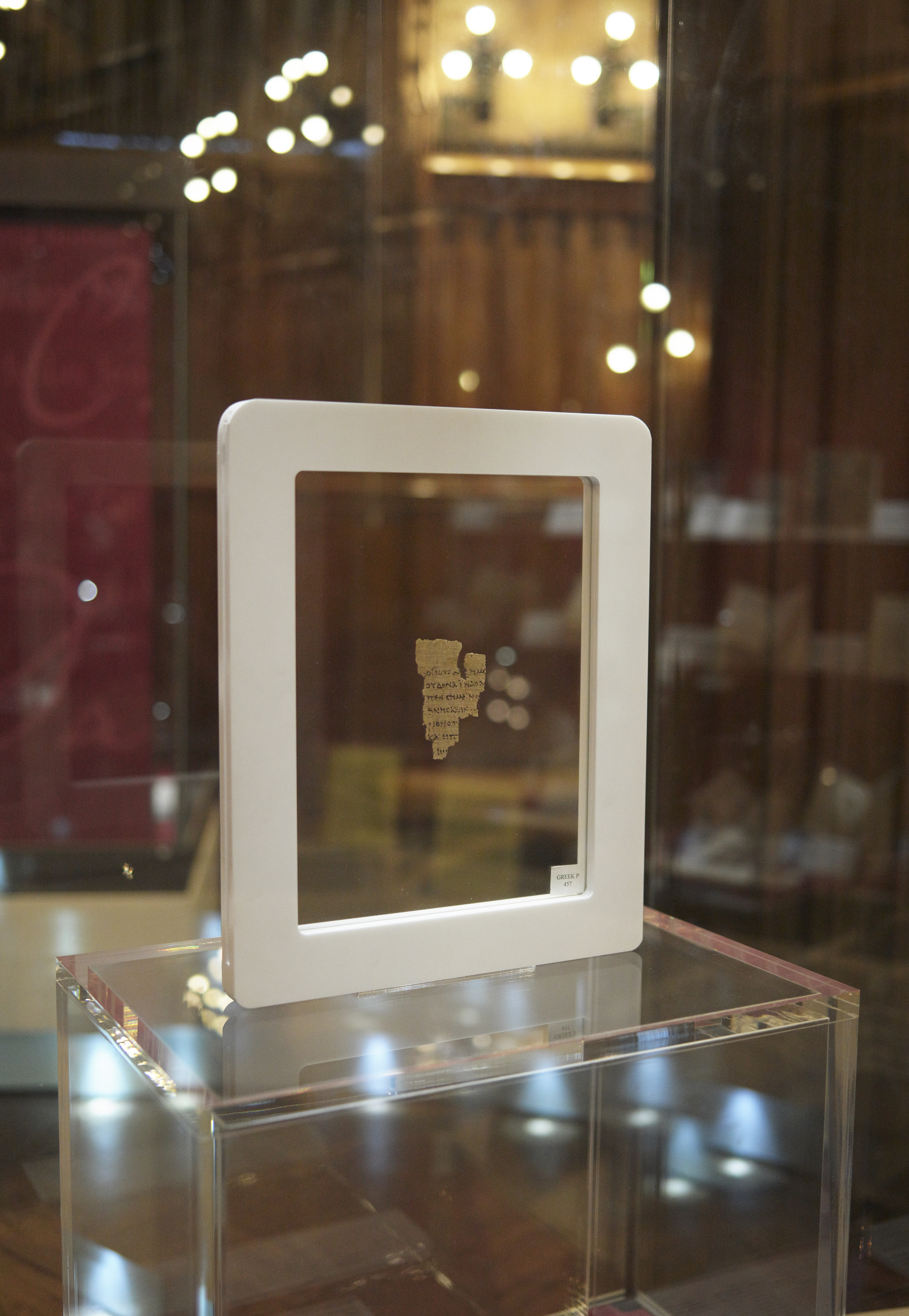
The Papyrus 52 (fragment of the Gospel of John) at the John Rylands Library

On opening in 1900, the library had 70,000 books and fewer than 100 manuscripts and by 2012, more than 250,000 printed volumes and over one million manuscripts and archival items. The main foundation of the library's collections acquired in 1892 was the Althorp Library of Lord Spencer regarded as one of the finest library collections in private ownership with 43,000 items - 3,000 of which originate from before 1501. Mrs Rylands paid £210,000 for Spencer's collection which included the Aldine Collection and an incunabula collection of 3,000 items. The incunabula included a few block books and the St Christopher block print (southern Germany, 1423) the latter being the earliest dated block print whose date in undisputed. During subsequent years, more than 1,000 more incunabula were added to the collection (from various sources).

Owens College Library received Richard Copley Christie's library of over 8,000 volumes including many rare books from the Renaissance period in 1901. It was part of the Victoria University of Manchester library from 1904 and was transferred to the John Rylands Library building after the merger in 1972. In 1901, Mrs Rylands paid £155,000 for more than 6,000 manuscripts owned by James Lindsay, 26th Earl of Crawford of Haigh Hall. The Bibliotheca Lindesiana was one of the most impressive private collections in Britain at the time, both for its size and rarity of some of its contents. Walter Llewellyn Bullock bequeathed 5,000 items (notably early Italian imprints) during the 1930s.

Mrs Rylands died in 1908 having bequeathed her private collections and an endowment of £200,000 to enable the library to expand. The funds were used to acquire 180,000 books, 3,000 manuscripts and extend the building. The Librarian, Henry Guppy, invited individuals to deposit their archives for safe keeping in 1921 when there were no county record offices in Lancashire or Cheshire and the library became one of the first to collect historical family records.

The library's collections include exquisite medieval illuminated manuscripts, examples of early European printing including a fine paper copy of the Gutenberg Bible and books printed by William Caxton, and personal papers of distinguished historical figures including Elizabeth Gaskell, John Dalton and John Wesley. There is no history of this copy of the Gutenberg Bible before it was acquired by the 2nd Earl Spencer.

The library houses papyrus fragments known as the Rylands Papyri and documents from North Africa. The most notable are the St John Fragment, believed to be the oldest extant New Testament text, Rylands Library Papyrus P52, the earliest fragment of the text of the canonical Gospel of John; the earliest fragment of the Septuagint, Papyrus Rylands 458; and Papyrus Rylands 463, a manuscript fragment of the apocryphal Gospel of Mary. Minuscule 702, ε2010 (von Soden), is a Greek minuscule manuscript of the New Testament, on parchment. Among the papyri from Oxyrhynchus are a homily about women (Inv R. 55247), part of the Book of Tobit (Apocrypha) (448), and Papyrus Oxyrhynchus 73, relating to the transfer of a slave. The Arabic papyri were catalogued by David Samuel Margoliouth; his catalogue was published in 1933. Non-Biblical texts include the Manchester Odyssey, among the oldest surviving vellum texts, and the oldest surviving Odyssey codex.

In addition to the collections of Spencer, Crawford, Christie and Bullock, holdings have been enriched by gifts, permanent loans or purchases of several libraries belonging to institutions and individuals. These include the French Revolution Broadsides donated by David Lindsay, 27th Earl of Crawford in 1924 and the archives of the Methodist Church of Great Britain in 1977. In 1924 the library purchased the greater part of the French revolutionary collection of the Bibliotheca Lindesiana; and then on the occasion of the library's semi-jubilee the 27th Earl of Crawford donated the French Revolutionary Broadsides from the Bibliotheca Lindesiana. Between 1946 and 1988 a number of sections of the Earl of Crawford's library were deposited here, however all but one of these were withdrawn in 1988.

The British Pop Archive, a national collection dedicated to the preservation and research of popular culture, opened with an exhibition at the library in May 2022.

Dr Williams's Library in London was relocated to the Institute in 2025.

== Staff ==
Librarians at John Rylands before its merger include Edward Gordon Duff in 1899 and 1900 and Henry Guppy between 1899 and 1948 (joint Librarian with Duff until 1900). Duff was responsible for the original library catalogue, compiled between 1893 and 1899: Catalogue of the Printed Books and Manuscripts in the John Rylands Library, Manchester; ed. E. G. Duff. Manchester: J. E. Cornish, 1899. 3 vols. The cataloguing of the books was done by Alice Margaret Cooke, a graduate of the Victoria University. Dr Guppy began publication of the Bulletin of the John Rylands Library in 1903; it later became a journal publishing academic articles and from autumn 1972 the title was changed to the Bulletin of the John Rylands University Library of Manchester (further slight changes have occurred since).

During the First World War 11 members of staff joined the armed forces; of these only Capt. O. J. Sutton, MC, lost his life while serving. Other noteworthy members of staff were James Rendel Harris, Alphonse Mingana, the Semitic scholar Professor Edward Robertson (d. 1964) who was the third librarian, and Moses Tyson, keeper of western manuscripts, afterwards librarian of Manchester University Library. Stella Butler, a medical historian, was Head of Special Collections from 2000 until 2009, and she moved to the University of Leeds in 2011 as University Librarian. From 2009 to 2019, Rachel Beckett was Head of Special Collections and Associate Director of The John Rylands Library. Christopher Pressler was appointed John Rylands University Librarian and Director of The University of Manchester Library in February 2019.

== John Rylands Research Institute ==
The John Rylands Research Institute was originally founded by Acting Librarian David Miller in 1987, to promote, fund and stimulate research on the primary material held at Deansgate. It was relaunched in 2013, with Professor Peter Pormann as director, as a collaboration between The University of Manchester's Faculty of Humanities and The John Rylands Library. The mission of the Institute is to open up the Library's Special Collections to innovative and multidisciplinary research, in partnership with researchers in Manchester and across the globe. Since its inception, the Institute has gained both national and international recognition and has been involved in attracting grants to support research on the collections from funders including the Arts and Humanities Research Council, Leverhulme Trust, British Academy and Marie Curie Foundation. In addition, generous philanthropic donations from Amin Amiri, David Shreeve, The Soudavar Memorial Foundation and Mark Younger, amongst others, have helped to support a range of important projects.

In September 2016, Hannah Barker, Professor of British History, took up the role as Director of the John Rylands Research Institute, and in March 2021, the John Rylands Research Institute and The John Rylands Library forged a new partnership as the John Rylands Research Institute and Library.

The library returned to its original name of The John Rylands Library in the summer of 2026.

== Governors and Trustees ==
Mrs Rylands established a board of trustees to hold the library's assets and a council of governors to maintain the building and control expenditure. The council consisted of some representative and some co-optative governors while honorary governors were not members of the council. Both these bodies were dissolved at the merger in 1972. Members of the council of governors included Arthur Peake and F. F. Bruce both biblical critics and Rylands Professors of Biblical Criticism and Exegesis.

== Visitors ==
Many notable people including heads of state have visited the library. King Charles III and Queen Camilla (as The Prince of Wales and The Duchess of Cornwall) have also visited.

== See also ==
- Grade I listed buildings in Greater Manchester
- Listed buildings in Manchester-M3

== Bibliography ==
- Archer, John H. G., ed. (1986) Art and Architecture in Victorian Manchester: ten illustrations of patronage and practice. Manchester: Manchester University Press ISBN 0-7190-0957-X (includes a study of the John Rylands Library by John Madden).
- Baker, William & Womack, Kenneth, eds. (1997) Nineteenth-century British Book-collectors and Bibliographers. Dictionary of Literary Biography; vol. 184.) Detroit, MI: Gale Research ISBN 9780787610739 (includes chapters on Alexander, 25th Earl of Crawford; John and Enriqueta Rylands; and George, 2nd Earl Spencer)
- Bowler, Catherine; Brimblecombe, Peter (2000). "Environmental pressures on building design and Manchester's John Rylands Library". Journal of Design History. 13 (3). The Design History Society: 175–191. doi:10.1093/jdh/13.3.175.
- Farnie, D. A. (1989) "Enriqueta Augustina Rylands (1843–1908), Founder of the John Rylands Library", in: Bulletin of the John Rylands University Library of Manchester LXXI,2 (summer 1989); pp. 3–38.
- Guppy, Henry (1924) The John Rylands Library (1899–1924): a record of its history with brief descriptions of the building and its contents. Manchester: University Press.
- Guppy, Henry (1929) "How Commerce has Assisted Culture Through the John Rylands Library", in: The Soul of Manchester. Manchester: U. P.; pp. 113–123.
- Guppy, Henry (1935) The John Rylands Library (1899–1935): a brief record of its history with descriptions of the building and its contents. Manchester: University Press.
- Lister, Anthony (1989) "The Althorp Library of Second Earl Spencer, now in the John Rylands University Library of Manchester: its formation and growth". In: Bulletin of the John Rylands University Library of Manchester; vol. LXXI, no. 2 (summer 1989), pp. 67–86 (online version).
- McNiven, Peter (2000) "The John Rylands Library, 1972–2000" in: Bulletin of the John Rylands University Library of Manchester LXXXII,2-3 (summer & autumn 2000); pp. 3–79.
- McNiven, Peter (2000) "An Illustrated Catalogue of 'A Scholars' Paradise: a Centenary Exhibition of Notable Books and Manuscripts' " in: Bulletin of the John Rylands University Library of Manchester LXXXII,2-3 (summer & autumn 2000); pp. 85–254.
- Parkinson-Bailey, John J. (2000). Manchester: an architectural history. Manchester: Manchester University Press. ISBN 0-7190-5606-3.
- Ratcliffe, F. W. (1980) "The John Rylands University Library", in: Treasures of the University of Manchester: an exhibition to celebrate the granting of the royal charter to the Victoria University in 1880; Whitworth Art Gallery, 26 April -- 28 June 1980.
- Sotheby's (1988) Books from the John Rylands University Library of Manchester: day of sale 14 April 1988. London: Sotheby's (98 works were offered for sale, of which a few remained unsold; all the books were rare duplicate copies; the funds raised were used to establish the John Rylands Research Institute in 1989).
- Taylor, Frank (1989) "The John Rylands Library, 1936–72" in: Bulletin of the John Rylands University Library of Manchester LXXI,2 (summer 1989); pp. 39–66.
- Tyson, Moses (1941) "The First Forty Years of the John Rylands Library" in: Bulletin of the John Rylands Library; vol. XXV, pp. 46–66.
- News from the Rylands: the newsletter of the Special Collections Division of the John Rylands University Library of Manchester. No. 1, winter 2000, etc. Replacing the John Rylands Research Institute Newsletter; 1990–1999.
