= Linford Group =

English construction company

- Type: Private
- Industry: Construction
- Founded: 1877
- Defunct: October 2011
- Headquarters: Lichfield, Staffordshire, England
- Key people: Simon Linford (CEO)
- Website: www.linfordgroup.co.uk

The Linford Group was a construction company in England which specialised in the restoration of historic buildings. Its headquarters was in Lichfield, Staffordshire.

== History ==
The company was founded as a family building business in 1877. It changed its name to F. & E.V. Linford in 1925 and again to Linford Group in 1970.

The company often worked with the local community to build a suitable skillbase for potential future employees to be drawn from, recruiting from local schools and offering employee exchange programmes with other overseas businesses. During the early 2000s, it established a new training center for learning heritage restoration skills.

It acquired metalwork restorer Dorothea Restorations in 2007, and the following year bought plasterwork business Trumpers. Amid the Great Recession, the company opted to increase its presence in the homebuilding sector.

During October 2011, it was announced that Linford Group was to be placed into administration as a result of a series of bad debts that had been incurred.

== Operations ==
The company was involved in the following activities:

- Building
- Renewal
- Restoration
