= Papyrus Oxyrhynchus 281 =

Greek papyrus fragment

Papyrus Oxyrhynchus 281 (P. Oxy. 281 or P. Oxy. II 281) is a fragment of a Complaint against a Husband, in Greek. It was discovered in Oxyrhynchus. The manuscript was written on papyrus in the form of a sheet. It is dated between years 20-50. Currently it is housed in the library of the Royal Holloway College in Surrey.

== Description ==
The document was written by Syra, a woman, and was addressed to Heraclides, a priest and chief justice. It is a petition addressed to the archidikastes by a woman who had been deserted by her husband, and who wished to recover the dowry which she had brought him on her marriage.

The measurements of the fragment are 181 by 93 mm.

This papyrus was discovered by Grenfell and Hunt in 1897 in Oxyrhynchus. It was found with 283, 294, and a number of other documents dated in the reigns of Tiberius, Gaius, and Claudius, and belongs to the same period.

The text was published by Grenfell and Hunt in 1899.

== See also ==
- Oxyrhynchus Papyri
- Papyrus Oxyrhynchus 282
