= Papyrus Oxyrhynchus 38 =

Greek papyrus fragment

Papyrus Oxyrhynchus 38 (P. Oxy. 38) is a petition to the prefect of Tryphon, written in Greek. It was discovered by Grenfell and Hunt in 1897 in Oxyrhynchus. The document was written after 29 March 49 CE. It is housed in the Egyptian Museum (Cat. Gen. 10002) in Cairo. The text was published by Grenfell and Hunt in 1898.

The manuscript was written on papyrus in the form of a sheet. The measurements of the fragment are 360 by 132 mm. The text is written in cursive letters.

== See also ==
- Oxyrhynchus Papyri
- Papyrus Oxyrhynchus 267
- Papyrus Oxyrhynchus 282
