= Papyrus Oxyrhynchus 295 =

Greek papyrus fragment

Papyrus Oxyrhynchus 295 (P. Oxy. 295 or P. Oxy. II 295) is a fragment of a letter in Greek, written by a woman to her mother. It was discovered in Oxyrhynchus. The manuscript was written on papyrus in the form of a sheet. It was written about 35. Currently it is housed in the library of the Columbia University (Rare Book & Manuscript Library) in New York City.

== Description ==
The measurements of the fragment are 250 by 84 mm.

The document was written by Thaisous and was addressed to her mother.

This papyrus was discovered by Grenfell and Hunt in 1897 in Oxyrhynchus. The text was published by Grenfell and Hunt in 1899.

The papyrus was found with Papyrus Oxyrhynchus 293 and Papyrus Oxyrhynchus 294. It is of the same early period.

== See also ==
- Oxyrhynchus Papyri
