= Papyrus Oxyrhynchus 240 =

Greek papyrus fragment

Papyrus Oxyrhynchus 240 (P. Oxy. 240 or P. Oxy. II 240) is a declaration by a village scribe, written in Greek. It was discovered in Oxyrhynchus. The manuscript was written on papyrus in the form of a sheet. It is dated 11 February 37. Currently it is housed at the British Library in London.

== Description ==
The manuscript contains a declaration by a village scribe denying that he has any knowledge of extortion by an unnamed soldier and his agents in the villages in which the scribe worked. The measurements of the fragment are 126 by 105 mm.

It was discovered by Grenfell and Hunt in 1897 in Oxyrhynchus. The text was published by Grenfell and Hunt in 1899.

== Text ==
I swear by Tiberius Caesar Novus Augustus Imperator, son of the deified Jupiter Liberator Augustus, that I know of no one in the village aforesaid from whom extortions have been made by the soldier...or his agents. If I swear truly, may it be well with me, but if falsely, the reverse. The 23rd year of Tiberius Caesar Augustus, Mecheir 17.

== See also ==
- Oxyrhynchus Papyri
- Papyrus Oxyrhynchus 284
- Papyrus Oxyrhynchus 285
