= Papyrus Oxyrhynchus 275 =

Greek papyrus fragment

Papyrus Oxyrhynchus 275 (P. Oxy. 275 or P. Oxy. II 275) is a fragment of a Contract of Apprenticeship, in Greek. It was discovered in Oxyrhynchus. The manuscript was written on papyrus in the form of a sheet. It is dated to 18 September 66. Currently it is housed in the British Library (Department of Manuscripts, 794) in London.

== Description ==
The document was written by Tryphon and Ptolemaeus. It is an agreement by which Tryphon, son of Dionysius (see POxy 247) apprenticed his son Thoonis expenses should in the first instance be borne by his father, but that Ptolemaeus should pay Tryphon an allowance of 5 drachmae a month for food and 12 drachmae at the end of the year for clothing; that Thoonis should serve his full year, and should make up at the end of it any days best of his ability. Money penalties are imposed on failure to fulfil these terms.

The measurements of the fragment are 379 by 97 mm.

It was discovered by Grenfell and Hunt in 1897 in Oxyrhynchus. The text was published by Grenfell and Hunt in 1899.

== See also ==
- Oxyrhynchus Papyri
