= Papyrus Oxyrhynchus 244 =

Discovered in Oxyrhynchus

Papyrus Oxyrhynchus 244 (P. Oxy. 244 or P. Oxy. II 244) is a fragment describing a transfer of cattle, written in Greek. It was discovered in Oxyrhynchus. The manuscript was written on papyrus in the form of a sheet. It is dated to 2 February 23. Currently it is housed in the British Library (Department of Manuscripts, 791) in London.

== Description ==
The document was written by Cerinthus, a slave, and was addressed to the strategus Chaereas (see P. Oxy. 245). Cerinthus's signature at the bottom of this document is one of the earliest known examples of Latin cursive writing to be found on papyrus. The measurements of the fragment are 280 by 136 mm.

It was discovered by Grenfell and Hunt in 1897 in Oxyrhynchus. The text was published by Grenfell and Hunt in 1899.

== See also ==
- Oxyrhynchus Papyri
