= Papyrus Oxyrhynchus 249 =

Greek papyrus fragment

Papyrus Oxyrhynchus 249 (P. Oxy. 249 or P. Oxy. II 249) is a fragment of a registration of some property, written by an unknown author, in Greek. It was discovered in Oxyrhynchus. The manuscript was written on papyrus in the form of a sheet. It is dated to 10 October 80. Currently it is housed in the Beinecke Rare Book and Manuscript Library (Inv. 37) of the Yale University in New Haven.

== Description ==
The document is dated by the same year and the same day as P. Oxy. 248. The measurements of the fragment are 210 by 72 mm. The text is written in an uncial hand.

It was discovered by Grenfell and Hunt in 1897 in Oxyrhynchus. The text was published by Grenfell and Hunt in 1899.

== See also ==
- Oxyrhynchus Papyri
