= Papyrus Oxyrhynchus 5 =

Ancient Greek manuscript

Papyrus Oxyrhynchus 5 (P. Oxy. 5) is a fragment of a Christian homily, written in Greek. It was discovered by Grenfell and Hunt in 1897 in Oxyrhynchus. The fragment is dated to the late third or early fourth century. It is housed in the Bodleian Library (Ms. Gr. Th. f 9). The text was published by Grenfell and Hunt in 1898.

The manuscript was written on papyrus in the form of a codex. The measures of the original leaf were 120 by 114 mm. The text is written in a good-sized uncial hand. The nomina sacra are written in an abbreviated way (Π̅Ν̅Α̅, Κ̅Σ̅, Ι̅Σ̅, Χ̅Σ̅). The recto side has survived in much better condition than the verso.

It quotes the Shepherd of Hermas.

== See also ==
- Oxyrhynchus Papyri
- Papyrus Oxyrhynchus 3
- Papyrus Oxyrhynchus 4
- Papyrus Oxyrhynchus 6
