= Papyrus Oxyrhynchus 292 =

Greek papyrus fragment

Papyrus Oxyrhynchus 292 (P. Oxy. 292 or P. Oxy. II 292) is a fragment of a Letter of Recommendation, in Greek. It was discovered in Oxyrhynchus. The manuscript was written on papyrus in the form of a sheet. It was written about 25. Currently it is housed in the Cambridge University Library (Add. Ms. 4057) in Cambridge.

== Description ==
The measurements of the fragment are 200 by 147 mm.

The document was written by Theon and was addressed to Tyrannus. It contains a Letter of Recommendation, with a reference to certain details of financial administration.

The text is written in a fine, bold, semi-uncial hand, with an unusual tendency to separation of words. P.Oxy 291 is of the same handwriting, but is rather more cursively written.

This papyrus was discovered by Grenfell and Hunt in 1897 in Oxyrhynchus. The text was published by Grenfell and Hunt in 1899.

== See also ==
- Oxyrhynchus Papyri
