= Papyrus Oxyrhynchus 272 =

Greek papyrus fragment

Papyrus Oxyrhynchus 272 (P. Oxy. 272 or P. Oxy. II 272) is a fragment of a Transfer of a Debt, in Greek. It was discovered in Oxyrhynchus. The manuscript was written on papyrus in the form of a sheet. It was written after 10 May 66. Previously it was held in Michigan. Currently the place of its housing is unknown.

== Description ==
The document is similar to Papyrus Oxyrhynchus 271. It is a contract between two men called Dionysius and Sarapion and a woman whose name does not appear.

The measurements of the fragment are 317 by 183 mm. The document is mutilated.

It was discovered by Grenfell and Hunt in 1897 in Oxyrhynchus. The text was published by Grenfell and Hunt in 1899.

== See also ==
- Oxyrhynchus Papyri
