= Papyrus Oxyrhynchus 255 =

Greek papyrus fragment

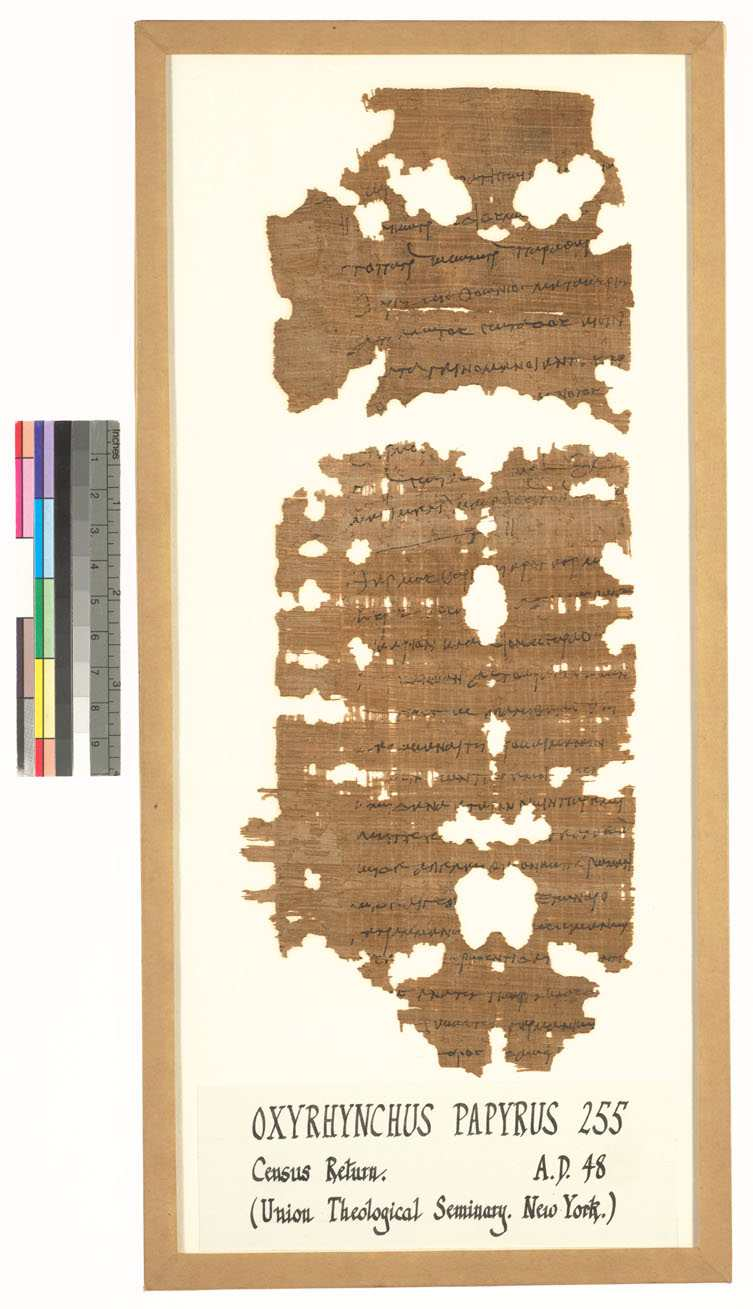

Papyrus Oxyrhynchus 255 (P. Oxy. 255 or P. Oxy. II 255) is a fragment of a census return, in Greek. It was discovered in Oxyrhynchus. The manuscript was written on papyrus in the form of a sheet. It is dated to the 28 September – 27 October 48. Currently it is housed in the Union Theological Seminary (Rare Book Library) in New York City.

== Description ==
The document is similar to POxy 254. It was written by a woman called Thermoutharion and was addressed to the officials. At the end is a declaration on oath that no one else was living in the house "neither a stranger, nor an Alexandrian citizen, nor a freedman, nor a Roman citizen, nor an Egyptian".

The measurements of the fragment are 160 by 115 mm. The text is written in an uncial hand.

It was discovered by Grenfell and Hunt in 1897 in Oxyrhynchus. The text was published by Grenfell and Hunt in 1899.

== See also ==
- Oxyrhynchus Papyri
