= Papyrus Oxyrhynchus 10 =

Greek manuscript

Papyrus Oxyrhynchus 10 (P. Oxy. 10) is a fragment of a comedy by an unknown author, written in Greek. It was discovered by Grenfell and Hunt in 1897 in Oxyrhynchus. The fragment is dated to the second or third century. It is housed at Yale University. The text was published by Grenfell and Hunt in 1898.

The manuscript was written on papyrus in the form of a roll. The measurements of the fragment are 144 by 142 mm. The fragment contains 20 lines, of which the last nine are almost complete. The text is written in a medium-sized upright uncial letters with a slight tendency towards cursive. The fragment is a monologue by a slave who wishes for freedom.

== See also ==
- Oxyrhynchus Papyri
- Papyrus Oxyrhynchus 9
- Papyrus Oxyrhynchus 11
