= Papyrus Oxyrhynchus 11 =

Fragment of a lost comedy, written in Greek

Papyrus Oxyrhynchus 11 (P. Oxy. 11) is a fragment of a lost comedy, written in Greek. It was discovered by Grenfell and Hunt in 1897 in Oxyrhynchus. The fragment is dated to the first or second century. It is housed in the British Library (Department of Manuscripts). The text was published by Grenfell and Hunt in 1898.

The manuscript was written on papyrus in the form of a roll. The measures of the fragment are 144 by 142 mm. The fragment contains two columns. The text is written in good-sized round upright uncial letters. Accents and rough breathings are given occasionally.

== See also ==
- Oxyrhynchus Papyri
- Papyrus Oxyrhynchus 10
- Papyrus Oxyrhynchus 12
