= Papyrus Oxyrhynchus 269 =

Greek papyrus fragment

Papyrus Oxyrhynchus 269 (P. Oxy. 269 or P. Oxy. II 269) is a fragment of a Loan of Money, in Greek. It was discovered in Oxyrhynchus. The manuscript was written on papyrus in the form of a sheet. It is dated to 13 May 57. Currently it is housed in the University of Pennsylvania (E 2760) in Philadelphia.

== Description ==
The document is an acknowledgment of a loan of 52 silver drachmae for a term of rather more than three months from Tryphon, son Dionysius, to Dioscorus.

The measurements of the fragment are 205 by 330 mm. The document is mutilated.

It was discovered by Grenfell and Hunt in 1897 in Oxyrhynchus. The text was published by Grenfell and Hunt in 1899.

== See also ==
- Oxyrhynchus Papyri
