= Papyrus Oxyrhynchus 298 =

Greek papyrus fragment

Papyrus Oxyrhynchus 298 (P. Oxy. 298 or P. Oxy. II 298) is a fragment of a Letter of a Tax-Collector, in Greek. It was discovered in Oxyrhynchus along with the other Oxyrhynchus Papyri. The manuscript was written on papyrus in the form of a sheet. It was written in the first century. Currently it is housed in the library of the Princeton University (Curator of Manuscripts, AM 4403) in Princeton (New Jersey).

== Description ==
The measurements of the fragment are 229 by 185 mm.

The document was written by an unknown scribe. It was published by Bernard Pyne Grenfell and Arthur Surridge Hunt in 1899.
