= Papyrus Oxyrhynchus 259 =

Greek papyrus fragment

Papyrus Oxyrhynchus 259 (P. Oxy. 259 or P. Oxy. II 259) is a fragment of Bail for a Prisoner, in Greek. It was discovered in Oxyrhynchus. The manuscript was written on papyrus in the form of a sheet. It was written after 17 May 23. Currently it is housed in the University of Pennsylvania (University Museum, E 2798) in Philadelphia.

== Description ==
The document was written by Theon to the governor of a public prison. The measurements of the fragment are 360 by 178 mm. The text is written in an uncial hand.

It was discovered by Grenfell and Hunt in 1897 in Oxyrhynchus. The text was published by Grenfell and Hunt in 1899.

== See also ==
- Oxyrhynchus Papyri
