= Papyrus Oxyrhynchus 300 =

Greek papyrus fragment

Papyrus Oxyrhynchus 300 (P. Oxy. 300 or P. Oxy. II 300) is a fragment of a Letter to a Relative, in Greek. It was discovered in Oxyrhynchus. The manuscript was written on papyrus in the form of a sheet. It was written in the late first century. It is not known where the document was distributed. The actual owner of the codex and place of its housing is unknown.

== Description ==
The measurements of the fragment are 116 by 108 mm.

The document was written by Indike to Thaisous about the dispatch of a bread-basket. It was published by Bernard Pyne Grenfell and Arthur Surridge Hunt in 1899.

== See also ==
- Oxyrhynchus Papyri
