= Papyrus Oxyrhynchus 9 =

Greek papyrus fragment of the Ruthmica Stoicheia

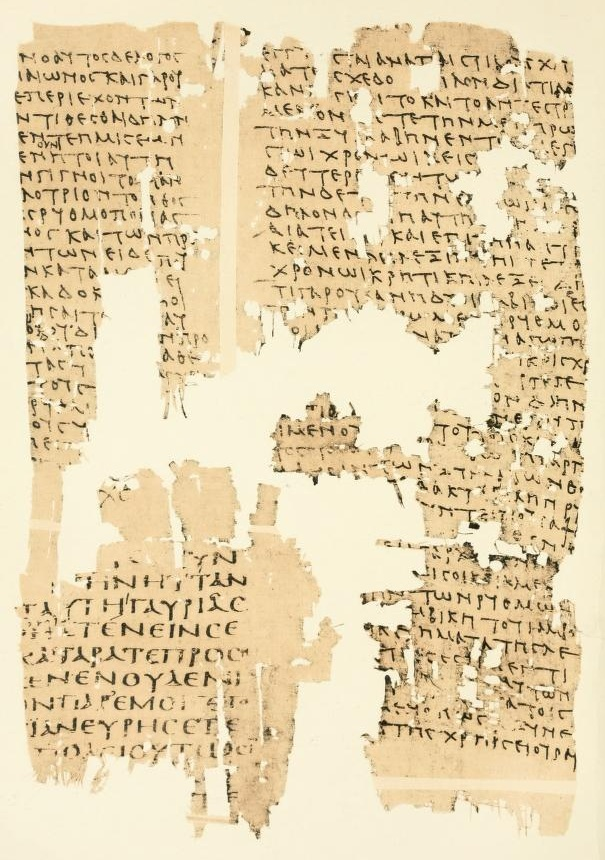
P. Oxy. 9

Papyrus Oxyrhynchus 9 (P. Oxy. 9) is a fragment of the "Ruthmica Stoicheia" of Aristoxenus of Tarentum, written in Greek. It was discovered by Grenfell and Hunt in 1897 in Oxyrhynchus, in Middle Egypt. The fragment is dated to the third century. It is housed at Trinity College, Dublin. The text was published by Grenfell and Hunt in 1898.

The manuscript was written on papyrus in the form of a roll. The measurements of the fragment are 227 by 435 mm. The fragment contains a five-column fragment of a treatise on meter. The text is written in an upright uncial hand.

== See also ==
- Oxyrhynchus Papyri
- Papyrus Oxyrhynchus 8
- Papyrus Oxyrhynchus 10
