= Papyrus Oxyrhynchus 258 =

Greek manuscript, c. 86–87

Papyrus Oxyrhynchus 258 (P. Oxy. 258 or P. Oxy. II 258) is a fragment of a Selection of Boys, in Greek. It was discovered in Oxyrhynchus. The manuscript was written on papyrus in the form of a sheet. It is dated to the year 86-87. The exact year is not quite certain. Currently it is housed in the Fondation Egyptologique Reine Elisabeth (Musées Royaux) in Brussels.

== Description ==
The document was written by a father of a boy aged thirteen to the officials. The measurements of the fragment are 162 by 87 mm. The text is written in an uncial hand.

It was discovered by Grenfell and Hunt in 1897 in Oxyrhynchus. The text was published by Grenfell and Hunt in 1899.

== See also ==
- Oxyrhynchus Papyri
