= Papyrus Oxyrhynchus 270 =

Surety Indemnification

Papyrus Oxyrhynchus 270 (P. Oxy. 270 or P. Oxy. II 270) is a fragment of an Indemnification of a Surety, in Greek. It was discovered in Oxyrhynchus. The manuscript was written on papyrus in the form of a sheet. It is dated between 26 January - 24 February 94. Currently it is housed in the British Library (Department of Manuscripts 793) in London.

== Description ==
The document is an agreement executed at Oxyrhynchus in the 13th year of Domitian between Lucia, with her second cousin Heras as guardian, and Sarapion. Sarapion had become surety for Lucia for the repayment of a loan of 3500 drachmae for two years and interest at the usual rate of 12 per cent a year, lent to Lucia by Heraclides on the security of various farms belonging to her.

The measurements of the fragment are 387 by 158 mm. The document is mutilated.

It was discovered by Grenfell and Hunt in 1897 in Oxyrhynchus. The text was published by Grenfell and Hunt in 1899.

== See also ==
- Oxyrhynchus Papyri
