= Papyrus Oxyrhynchus 6 =

Fragment of ancient Egyptian manuscript from 3rd century BC

Papyrus Oxyrhynchus 6 (P. Oxy. 6) is a fragment of the Acts of Paul and Thecla, written in Greek. It was discovered by Grenfell and Hunt in 1897 in Oxyrhynchus. The fragment is dated to the fifth century. It is housed in the Cambridge University Library. The text was published by Grenfell and Hunt in 1898.

The manuscript was written on papyrus in a form of the codex. The measures of the original leaf were 73 by 67 mm. The fragment containing portions of chapters VIII and IX. The text is written in a small and irregular uncial letters. The text varies from the other known manuscripts.

== See also ==
- Oxyrhynchus Papyri
- Papyrus Oxyrhynchus 5
- Papyrus Oxyrhynchus 7
