= Papyrus Oxyrhynchus 260 =

Greek papyrus fragment

Papyrus Oxyrhynchus 260 (P. Oxy. 260 or P. Oxy. II 260) is a fragment of a Promise of Attendance in Court, in Greek. It was discovered in Oxyrhynchus. The manuscript was written on papyrus in the form of a sheet. It is dated to 3 July 59. Currently it is housed in the Trinity College (Pap. D 3) in Dublin.

== Description ==
The document is a declaration of the two men, Antiphanes, son of Ammonius, and Antiphanes, son of Heraclas, that they would attend the court in Alexandria for a stated period. The measurements of the fragment are 277 by 115 mm. The text is written in an uncial hand.

It was discovered by Grenfell and Hunt in 1897 in Oxyrhynchus. The text was published by Grenfell and Hunt in 1899.

== See also ==
- Oxyrhynchus Papyri
