= Papyrus Oxyrhynchus 261 =

Greek papyrus fragment

Papyrus Oxyrhynchus 261 (P. Oxy. 261 or P. Oxy. II 261) is a fragment of an Appointment of a Representative, in Greek. It was discovered in Oxyrhynchus. The manuscript was written on papyrus in the form of a sheet. It is dated to 55–56. Currently it is housed in the British Library (Department of Manuscripts, 792) in London.

== Description ==
The document was written by a woman, named Demetria. Demetria appoints her grandson Chaeremon to act as her representative in a lawsuit which was pending between herself and a certain Epimachus. The measurements of the fragment are 246 by 158 mm. The text is written in an uncial hand.

It was discovered by Grenfell and Hunt in 1897 in Oxyrhynchus. The text was published by Grenfell and Hunt in 1899.

== See also ==
- Oxyrhynchus Papyri
