= Papyrus Oxyrhynchus 14 =

Poems

Papyrus Oxyrhynchus 14 (P. Oxy. 14) is a fragment of an elegiac poem by an unknown author in Greek. It was discovered by Grenfell and Hunt in 1897 in Oxyrhynchus. The fragment is dated to the second or third century. It is housed in the Edinburgh University Library. The text was published by Grenfell and Hunt in 1898.

The manuscript was written on papyrus in the form of a roll. The measurements of the fragment are 185 by 72 mm. There is a reference to a well-known passage of the Iliad. The text is written in a clear upright uncial hand. The margins are very deep (7,8 cm). According to the publishers the blank space was intended for scholia.

== See also ==
- Oxyrhynchus Papyri
- Papyrus Oxyrhynchus 13
- Papyrus Oxyrhynchus 15
