= Papyrus Oxyrhynchus 257 =

Greek papyrus fragment

Papyrus Oxyrhynchus 257 (P. Oxy. 257 or P. Oxy. II 257) is a fragment of a census return, in Greek. It was discovered in Oxyrhynchus. The manuscript was written on papyrus in the form of a sheet. It is dated to the year 94-95. The owner of the fragment and the place of its current housing is unknown.

== Description ==
The document was written by an unknown author to the officials. The measurements of the fragment are 150 by 68 mm. The text is written in an uncial hand.

It was discovered by Grenfell and Hunt in 1897 in Oxyrhynchus. The text was published by Grenfell and Hunt in 1899.

== See also ==
- Oxyrhynchus Papyri
