= Papyrus Oxyrhynchus 256 =

Greek papyrus fragment

Papyrus Oxyrhynchus 256 (P. Oxy. 256 or P. Oxy. II 256) is a fragment of a census return, in Greek. It was discovered in Oxyrhynchus. The manuscript was written on papyrus in the form of a sheet. It is dated to the year 34. Currently it is housed in the Union Theological Seminary (Rare Book Library) in New York City.

== Description ==
The document was written by three women to the strategus.

The date of papyrus is lost, but it is estimated to about 34 AD.

The measurements of the fragment are 150 by 68 mm. The text is written in an uncial hand.

It was discovered by Grenfell and Hunt in 1897 in Oxyrhynchus. The text was published by Grenfell and Hunt in 1899.

== See also ==
- Oxyrhynchus Papyri
