= Papyrus Oxyrhynchus 248 =

Greek papyrus fragment

Papyrus Oxyrhynchus 248 (P. Oxy. 248 or P. Oxy. II 248) is a fragment of a registration of some property, written in Greek. It was discovered in Oxyrhynchus. The manuscript was written on papyrus in the form of a sheet. It is dated to 10 October 80. Currently it is housed in the Cambridge University Library (Add. Ms. 4053) in Cambridge, England.

== Description ==
The document was written by Demetrius of behalf of his son Amois, who had inherited some property from his grandfather Serapion. It is addressed to the keepers of the archives. The document is similar to P. Oxy. 247, housed in the Glasgow University Library in Glasgow. The measurements of the fragment are 370 by 115 mm. The text is written in an uncial hand.

It was discovered by Grenfell and Hunt in 1897 in Oxyrhynchus. The text was published by Grenfell and Hunt in 1899.

== See also ==
- Oxyrhynchus Papyri
