= Papyrus Oxyrhynchus 250 =

Greek papyrus fragment

Papyrus Oxyrhynchus 250 (P. Oxy. 250 or P. Oxy. II 250) is a fragment of a registration of some property, written by an unknown author in Greek. It was discovered in Oxyrhynchus. The manuscript was written on papyrus in the form of a sheet. It is dated to 26 April - 25 May 61. Currently it is housed in the library of the University of Pennsylvania (E 2797) in Philadelphia.

== Description ==
It was written by the author, whose name is lost. It is addressed to the keepers of the archives. The measurements of the fragment are 223 by 108 mm. The text is written in an uncial hand.

It was discovered by Grenfell and Hunt in 1897 in Oxyrhynchus. The text was published by Grenfell and Hunt in 1899.

== See also ==
- Oxyrhynchus Papyri
