= Papyrus 1 =

Early copy of part of the New Testament in Greek

Papyrus 𝔓^{1}
- New Testament manuscript
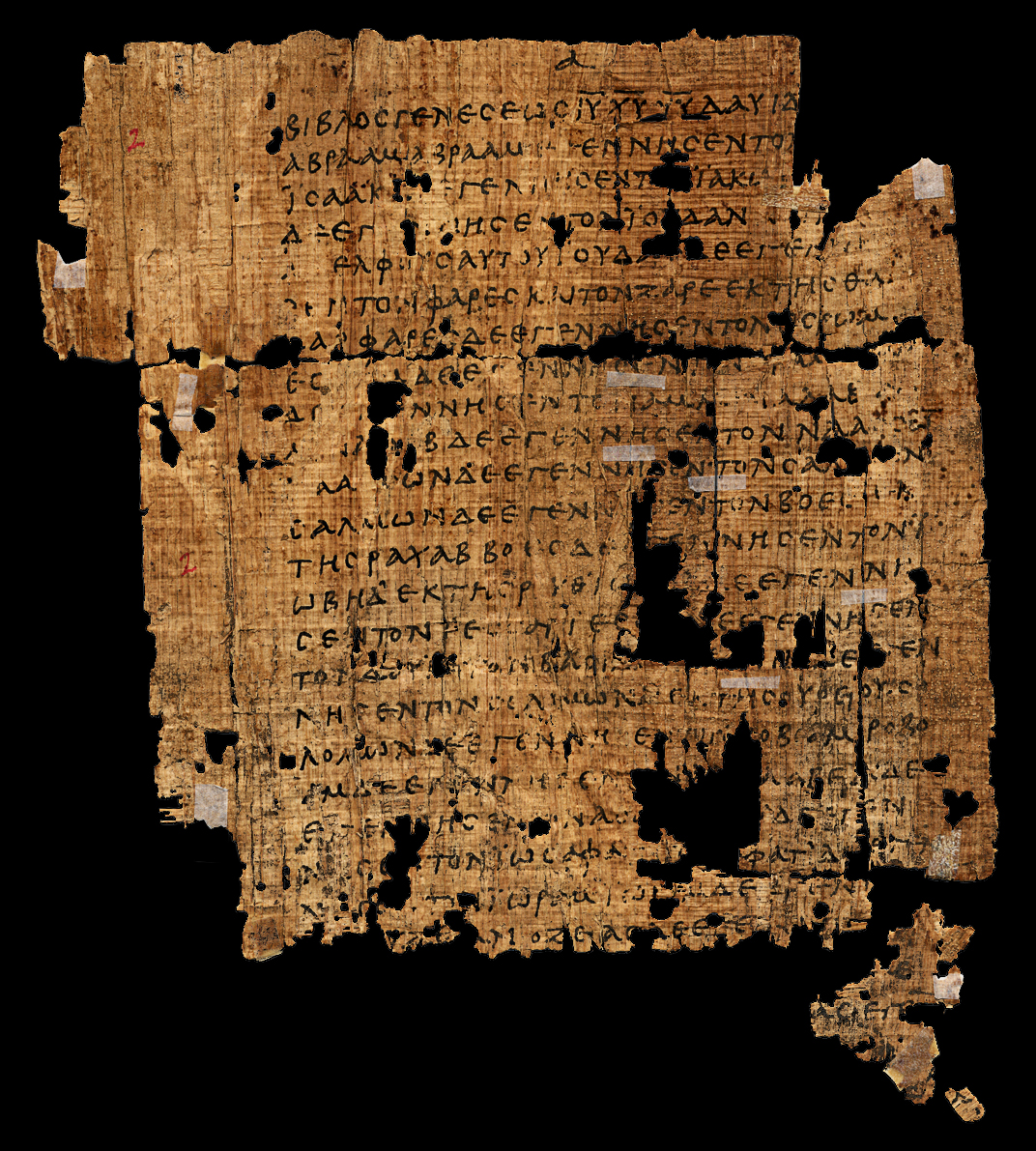
- An image of Papyrus 1 (recto), showing Matthew 1:1–9, 12
- Name: P. Oxy. 2
- Text: Matthew 1:1–9,12,14-20
- Date: c. ~250
- Found: Oxyrhynchus, Egypt
- Now at: University of Pennsylvania
- Cite: B. P. Grenfell & A. S. Hunt, Oxyrhynchus Papyri I, pp. 4–7, 1898.
- Size: 1 leaf; 12 × 25 cm; 37–38 lines/page
- Type: Alexandrian text-type
- Category: I
- Note: Close to Codex Vaticanus.

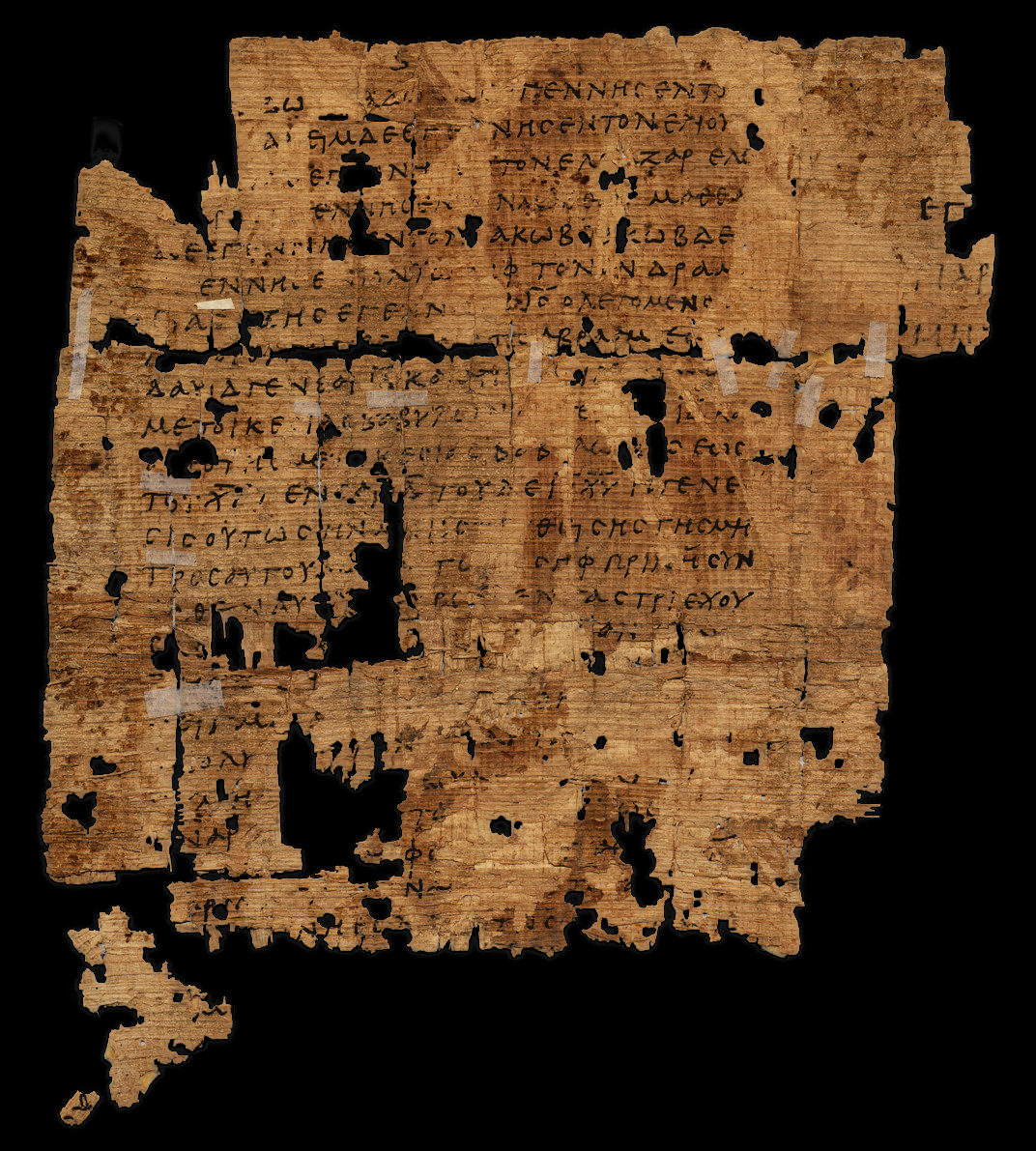
Verso.

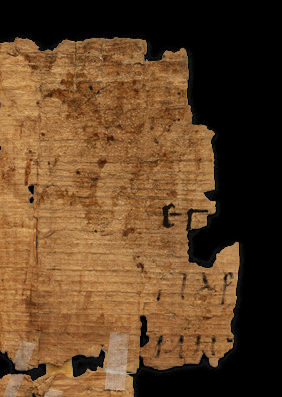
Fragment of a flyleaf.

Papyrus 1 is an early papyrus manuscript of one chapter of the Gospel of Matthew in Greek. It is designated by the siglum 𝔓^{1} in the Gregory-Aland numbering of New Testament manuscripts, and as ε 01 in the von Soden numbering of New Testament manuscripts. Using the study of comparative writing styles (palaeography), it is dated to the early 3rd century. It was discovered in Oxyrhynchus, Egypt. It is currently housed at the University of Pennsylvania Museum (E 2746).

== Description ==
The manuscript was a codex (precursor to the modern book format), of which a fragment of one bifolium has survived. The text is written in one column per page, with 27–29 lines per page preserved, roughly sized 14.7 cm (6 in) by 15 cm (6 in). The dimensions of the original codex were likely 12 cm wide and about 25 cm high, and the codex may have been a single large quire consisting of 23 papyrus bifolia.

The surviving text of Matthew are verses 1:1–9,12 and 13,14–20. The words are written continuously without separation. Accents and breathings are absent, except two breathings which are a smooth breathing on fifth letter (ωβηδ ἐκ) in line 14 of the verso and a rough breathing on the fourth letter to last letter (ἡ συν) in line 14 of the recto. The manuscript includes the nomina sacra (early abbreviations of names/titles considered sacred in Christianity), of which the following are witnessed:: Ι̅Ϲ̅ (ιησους / Jesus), X̅C̅ (χριστος / Christ), Y̅C̅ (υιος / son), Π̅Ν̅Α̅ (πνευμα / Spirit), K̅Σ̅ (κυριος / Lord).

== Text ==
The Greek text of this codex is considered to be a representative of the Alexandrian. Biblical scholar Kurt Aland placed it in Category I of his New Testament manuscript classification system.

According to scholars, 𝔓^{1} has close agreement with Codex Vaticanus. It supports Vaticanus in 1:3 in reading ζαρε (against ζαρα). Ten of the variants are in the spelling of names in the genealogy of Jesus Christ. Biblical scholar Herman C. Hoskier, who found 17–20 word variations (see below), denied close agreement with Vaticanus.

Text according to Comfort

Recto

α

[1:1] βιβλος γενεσεως Ι̅Υ̅ Χ̅Υ̅ Υ̅Υ̅ δαυιδ [Υ̅Υ̅]
αβρααμ [1:2] αβρααμ ε̣γ̣εννησεν τον̣ [ισαακ]
ισαακ δ̣[ε] ε̣γενν̣η̣σεν τ[ον] ιακω̣β̣ [ιακωβ]
δε εγ[ε]ν̣ν̣ησεν̣ τ̣ον̣ ιου̣δαν κ̣[α]ι̣ τ̣[ους]
α̣[δ]ελφο̣υ̣ς αυτου [1:3] ιουδα̣ς̣ δ̣ε εγεν̣ν̣η̣
σ̣ε̣ν̣ τον φαρες και τον ζαρε εκ της θα̣
μ̣αρ̣ φαρες δε εγεννησεν τον ε̣σρ̣ωμ
εσ[ρω]μ̣ δε εγ̣ε̣ννη̣σ̣ε̣ν τ̣[ο]ν̣ α̣ρ̣α̣μ̣ [1:4] α̣[ραμ]
δε̣ [ε]γ̣ε̣ννησεν το̣ν̣ α̣μ̣μ̣ι̣ν̣α̣δ̣α̣β̣ α̣μ̣
μ̣[ι]ν̣α̣δ̣[α]β δε εγεννησεν̣ τον ναασ̣σων
ν̣αα[σ]σων δε εγενν[ησ]ε̣ν τον σαλ̣[μω]ν
[1:5] σαλμων δε εγενν[η]σ̣εν τον βοες̣ [εκ]
της ραχαβ βοες δε ε̣γ̣ε̣ννησεν τον ι
ωβηδ’εκ της ρ[ο]υθ ιω̣[βηδ δ]ε εγεννη̣
σεν τον ιεσ̣σ̣α̣ι [1:6] ιεσ̣σ̣[αι] δ̣ε ε̣γ̣ε̣ν̣νησεν
τον δα̣υ̣ι̣δ̣ τ̣ον βα̣σιλ̣ε̣[α δαυ]ι̣δ̣ δ̣ε̣ εγ̣εν
νησ̣εν τον σο̣λο̣μωνα̣ ε̣κ̣ τ̣η̣ς ουρειου. [1:7] σο̣
λομ̣ων δε εγενν̣ησ̣εν̣ τ̣ο̣ν̣ [ρ]οβοαμ ροβο
α̣μ δε εγ̣ενν̣η̣σ̣εν̣ τ̣[ο]ν̣ [αβει]α αβ̣ει̣α̣ δε
εγεν̣ν̣ησεν [το]ν ασα̣[φ] [1:8] [α]σ[α]φ̣ δε̣ ε̣γ̣ε̣ν
νη̣σ̣ε̣ν̣ τον ιωσαφατ̣ ι̣[ω]σ̣α̣φατ δ[ε] ε̣γε̣ν
ν[η]σ̣ε̣[ν] το̣ν̣ ιωραμ ιωρ̣α̣μ̣ δε εγεν̣[νησεν
τον] ο̣ζε̣[ι]α̣ν [1:9] οζει̣ας̣ δ̣ε εγ̣εν̣[νησεν]
lacuna [1:12] lacuna [με
τοικεσιαν βαβυλωνος ιεχονι]ας εγ[εν
νησεν] lacuna

Verso

[1:14] [lacuna] β

[τον σ]α̣δω[κ σ]αδωκ̣ δε̣ ε̣γεννησεν το[ν
αχειμ] αχ̣ειμ δε εγε[ν]νησεν τον ελιου[δ]
[1:15] [ελιου]δ̣ δ̣ε̣ εγ[εν]νη̣[σ]ε̣[ν] τον ελε̣α̣ζαρ ελε
[αζ]α̣ρ [δε εγ]ενν̣ησεν [το]ν μ̣α̣θ̣θα̣ν̣ μαθθα̣[ν]
δ̣ε ε̣γε̣ν̣νη̣[σ]ε̣ν τον̣ [ι]ακωβ [1:16] ια̣κωβ δε
[εγ]εννησ̣εν̣ τ̣ον ιωσ̣η̣φ τον α̣νδρα μ̣[α]
ρ̣ι̣ας̣ [ε]ξ ης εγενν[ηθ]η̣ Ι̅Σ̅ ο λεγομενο[ς Χ̅Σ̅]
[1:17] π̣ασ̣α̣ι̣ ο̣υ̣ν̣ γ̣ε̣[νε]α̣ι̣ α̣πο αβρααμ εω̣ς̣
δαυιδ γενεαι Ι̅Δ̅ και̣ απο̣ [δ]α̣[υ]ι̣δ̣ [ε]ω̣ς̣ τ̣η̣[ς]
μετοικεσ̣ια̣ς βαβυλωνο̣[ς] γ̣ε[νεαι] Ι̅Δ̅ κ̣α̣[ι]
α̣π̣ο της μετ̣[οι]κεσι̣ας βα̣β[υ]λων̣[ο]ς εως
του Χ̅Υ̅ γ̣ενε̣α̣ι̣ [Ι̅]Δ̅ [1:18] του δε Ι̅Υ̅ Χ̅Υ̅ η γενε
σις ουτως ην μ̣ν̣ηστ̣ε̣[υ]θεισης της μη
τρος αυτου μ̣[αρι]α̣[ς] τω̣ [ιω]σηφ πριν η̆ συν
[ε]λ̣θε̣[ι]ν αυ[το]υ̣[ς] ε̣υ̣ρε̣[θη] ε̣ν γ̣αστρι εχου
σα̣ ε̣[κ Π̅Ν̅Σ̅ αγιου] [1:19] [ιωσηφ δε ο] ανη̣ρ̣ α̣υ̣
τ̣η̣ς̣ [δι]κ̣α̣ι[ος ων και μη θελων αυτην]
δ̣ειγμα̣[τ]ε̣[ισαι εβουλη]θ̣η̣ [λαθρα
α]π̣ο̣λυ[σαι] α̣[υ]τ̣[η]ν̣ [1:20] [τ]αυ̣τ̣α̣ [δε αυτου εν
θ]υ̣μ̣η[θεντος ι]δ̣ο̣υ̣ α̣γ̣[γελο]ς̣ Κ̅Υ̅ [κ]α̣[τ
ο]ν̣αρ [εφανη αυ]τω̣ [λεγων] ι̣ω̣σ̣[η]φ
υιος] δ̣[αυιδ] μ̣[η] φο̣[βηθη]ς̣ π̣α̣ρ̣[αλαβ]ει̅
[μ]α̣ρι̣α̣ν̣ [την] γ̣υ̣ναι[κα σου] τ̣ο̣ [γαρ εν αυ
τη γεν]νηθ̣ε̣ν̣ ε̣[κ] Π̅Ν̅Σ̅ [εστιν] α̣[γιου]
[1:21–23] lacuna
με̣[θερμηνευομενον μεθ ημων ο Θ̅Σ̅]

Disagreement with Vaticanus (according to Hoskier)

Papyrus 1

Υ̅Υ̅
ΔΑΥΙΔ
ΑΜΙΝΑΔΑΒ
ΔΑΥΙΔ
ΤΗΣ ΟΥΡΕΙΟΥ
ΑΒ[ΕΙ]Α
ΑΒΕΙΑ
ΕΓΕ[ΝΗΣΕΝ]
illeg
illeg
illeg
ΜΑΘΘΑΝ
ΙΩΣΗΦ
ΓΕΝΕΑΙ
ΔΑΥΙΔ
ΔΑΥΙΔ
Ι̅Δ̅
ΙΥ ΧΥ
ΔΕΙΓΜΑ[Τ]ΕΙΣΑΙ
ΔΑΥΙΔ

Vaticanus

ΥΙΟΥ
ΔΑΥΕΙΔ
ΑΜΕΙΝΑΔΑΒ
ΔΑΥΕΙΔ
ΤΗΣ ΤΟΥ ΟΥΡΕΙΟΥ
ΑΒΙΑ
ΑΒΙΑ
ΓΕΝΝΑ
ΤΟΝ ΣΕΛΑΘΙΗΛ
ΣΕΛΑΘΙΗΛ ΔΕ ΓΕΝΝΑ
ΑΒΙΟΥΤ
ΜΑΤΘΑΝ
ΤΟΝ ΙΩΣΗΦ
ΑΙ ΓΕΝΕΑΙ
ΔΑΥΕΙΔ
ΔΑΥΕΙΔ
ΔΕΚΑΤΕΣΣΑΡΕΣ
ΧΥ ΙΥ
ΔΕΙΓΜΑΤΙΣΑΙ
ΔΑΥΕΙΔ

== History ==
Papyrologists Bernard Pyne Grenfell and Arthur Surridge Hunt discovered this papyrus at Oxyrhynchus in Egypt, on the third or fourth day of excavation, January 13 or 14, 1897. Their findings were published in the first volume of The Oxyrhynchus Papyri in 1898. The manuscript was examined by Francis Crawford Burkitt, Herman C. Hoskier, Comfort, and many other scholars.

Grenfell and Hunt collated its text against the Textus Receptus and against the text of Westcott-Hort. They found that the manuscript belongs to the same class as the Sinaiticus and Vaticanus codices, and has no Western or Byzantine proclivities. Usually it agrees with these two codices, where they are in agreement. Where they differ, the manuscript is near to Vaticanus, except in one important case (του δε Ιησου Χριστου / Now, the [birth] of Jesus Christ), where it agrees with Sinaiticus. It was the earliest known manuscript of the New Testament until the discovery of Papyrus 45 (𝔓^{45}).

== See also ==
- List of New Testament papyri
- Matthew 1
- Oxyrhynchus Papyri
- Papyrus Oxyrhynchus 1
- Papyrus Oxyrhynchus 3
- Papyrus Oxyrhynchus 16
