= Papyrus Oxyrhynchus 13 =

Ancient Greek manuscript

Papyrus Oxyrhynchus 13 (P. Oxy. 13) is a fragment of a letter to a King of Macedon, written in Greek. It was discovered by Grenfell and Hunt in 1897 in Oxyrhynchus. The fragment is dated to the second or third century. It is housed at Columbia University (Head of Special Collections). The text was published by Grenfell and Hunt in 1898.

The manuscript was written on papyrus in the form of a roll. The measurements of the fragment are 87 by 71 mm. The fragment contains 18 lines of text. It seems to have been addressed to Antigonus I or his son Demetrius Poliorcetes. The text is written in a medium-sized uncial hand.

== See also ==
- Oxyrhynchus Papyri
- Papyrus Oxyrhynchus 12
- Papyrus Oxyrhynchus 14
