= Papyrus Oxyrhynchus 264 =

Greek papyrus fragment

Papyrus Oxyrhynchus 264 (P. Oxy. 264 or P. Oxy. II 264) is a fragment of a sale of a loom, in Greek. It was discovered in Oxyrhynchus. The manuscript was written on papyrus in the form of a sheet. It is dated to 8 August 54. It is housed in the Cambridge University Library (Add. Ms. 4054) in Cambridge.

== Description ==
The document was written by Ammonius. It is a contract for the sale of a loom to Tryphon, son of Dionysius, by Ammonius. The agreement is followed by the signature of the vendor, and a docket of the bank of Sarapion through which the purchase money, 20 drachmae of silver, was paid.

The measurements of the fragment are 250 by 111 mm.

It was discovered by Bernard Grenfell and Arthur Surridge Hunt in 1897 in Oxyrhynchus. The text was published by Grenfell and Hunt in 1899.

== See also ==
- Oxyrhynchus Papyri
