= Women's Progressive Society =

International suffrage group founded in London

Women's Progressive Society was a suffrage pressure group formed in London in 1890 that rapidly gained an international membership. It led to the formation of the International Women's Union in 1893.

== History ==
Mrs Warner Snoad wrote a letter in 1890 to the Women's Penny Paper in which she proposed that politically active women should refuse to campaign for male political candidates unless they supported women's suffrage. The idea was popularly received and the Women's Progressive Society was formed as an affiliate of the Central National Society. The society supported Women's Suffrage and a campaign to ignore its opponents. The society was not associated with any political party.

Its president was Mrs Warner Snoad and its executive members were Margaret Sibthorp (of Shafts magazine0 Emily Langton Massingberd and Mrs Morgan-Browne. Vice-presidents were feminist Jane Brownlow, writer Sara Hennell, Matilda Blind and internationally Henrik Ibsen, Elizabeth Cady Stanton, Leon Richer and Clara Bewick Colby. Alice Grenfell was the honorary secretary. In 1893 Colby presented Warner Snoad's ideas at the World's Congress of International Women in Chicago this led on to the formation of the International Women's Union which lasted from 1893 to 1898.
