= Papyrus Oxyrhynchus 274 =

Greek papyrus fragment

Papyrus Oxyrhynchus 274 (P. Oxy. 274 or P. Oxy. II 274) is a fragment of a Register of Property, in Greek. It was discovered in Oxyrhynchus. The manuscript was written on papyrus in the form of a sheet. It is dated to 28 August 97. Currently it is housed in the Union Theological Seminary (Rare Book Library) in New York City.

== Description ==
The document was written by an unknown scribe. It is a part of an official Register of real Property owned by various persons.

The measurements of the fragment are 345 by 215 mm. The document is mutilated.

It was discovered by Grenfell and Hunt in 1897 in Oxyrhynchus. The text was published by Grenfell and Hunt in 1899.

== See also ==
- Oxyrhynchus Papyri
