= Papyrus Oxyrhynchus 263 =

Fragment of a sale, dated AD 77

Papyrus Oxyrhynchus 263 (P. Oxy. 263 or P. Oxy. II 263) is a fragment of a Sale of a Slave, in Greek. It was discovered in Oxyrhynchus. The manuscript was written on papyrus in the form of a sheet. It is dated to 21 April 77. Currently it is housed in the University of Melbourne (Department of Classical Studies, Pap. 3) in Melbourne.

== Description ==
The document is a declaration on oath addressed to the agoranomi, written by Bacche with her guardian Diognetus. The document stated that Bacche had sold to Heliodora an eight-year-old female slave, and that she had received the price 640 drachmae.

The measurements of the fragment are 160 by 156 mm.

It was discovered by Grenfell and Hunt in 1897 in Oxyrhynchus. The text was published by Grenfell and Hunt in 1899.

== See also ==
- Oxyrhynchus Papyri
