= Papyrus Oxyrhynchus 289 =

Greek papyrus fragment

Papyrus Oxyrhynchus 289 (P. Oxy. 289 or P. Oxy. II 289) is a fragment containing taxation accounts, in Greek. It was discovered in Oxyrhynchus. The manuscript, written on papyrus in the form of a sheet, was written after 26 January 83. Currently it is housed in the British Library (Department of Manuscripts 799) in London.

== Description ==
The measurements of the fragment are 216 by 530 mm. The document is mutilated.

The document was written by an unknown author. It contains taxation accounts.

This papyrus was discovered by Grenfell and Hunt in 1897 in Oxyrhynchus. The text was published by Grenfell and Hunt in 1899.

== See also ==
- Oxyrhynchus Papyri
