= Papyrus Oxyrhynchus 299 =

Greek papyrus fragment

Papyrus Oxyrhynchus 299 (P. Oxy. 299 or P. Oxy. II 299) is a fragment of a Letter concerning a Mouse-Catcher, in Greek. It was discovered in Oxyrhynchus. The manuscript was written on papyrus in the form of a sheet. It was written in the late first century. Formerly it was held in the Bradfield College. The actual owner of the codex and place of its housing is unknown.

== Description ==
The measurements of the fragment are 54 by 108 mm.

The document was written by Horus to Appion about the payment of a mouse-catcher. It was published by Bernard Pyne Grenfell and Arthur Surridge Hunt in 1899.

== See also ==
- Oxyrhynchus Papyri
