= Papyrus Oxyrhynchus 4 =

Greek papyrus fragment

Papyrus Oxyrhynchus 4 (P. Oxy. 4) is a fragment of a Christian theological work in Greek. It was discovered by Grenfell and Hunt in 1897 in Oxyrhynchus. The fragment is dated to the early 4th century. It is housed in the library of the University of Cambridge. The text was published by Grenfell and Hunt in 1898.

The manuscript was written on papyrus in the form of a codex. The measures of the original leaf were 127 by 72 mm. On the verso side the text is written in a medium-sized uncial letters. On the recto it is written in cursive letters. The nomina sacra are written in an abbreviated way (Θ̅Σ̅). It is a theological text, Gnostic in character, concerning the 'upper' and 'lower' soul.

== See also ==
- Oxyrhynchus Papyri
- Papyrus Oxyrhynchus 1
- Papyrus Oxyrhynchus 3
- Papyrus Oxyrhynchus 5
