= Papyrus Oxyrhynchus 290 =

Greek papyrus fragment

Papyrus Oxyrhynchus 290 (P. Oxy. 290 or P. Oxy. II 290) is a fragment of a Work on Embankments, in Greek. It was discovered in Oxyrhynchus. The manuscript was written on papyrus in the form of a sheet. It was written between 83-84. Currently it is housed in the University Museum (E 2761) of the University of Pennsylvania in Philadelphia.

== Description ==
The measurements of the fragment are 278 by 910 millimetres (10.9 by 35.8 in). The document is mutilated.

The document was written by an unknown author. It contains a Work on Embankments.

This papyrus was discovered by Grenfell and Hunt in 1897 in Oxyrhynchus. The text was published by Grenfell and Hunt in 1899.

== See also ==
- Oxyrhynchus Papyri
