= Papyrus Oxyrhynchus 278 =

Greek papyrus fragment from Oxyrhynchus

Papyrus Oxyrhynchus 278 (P. Oxy. 278 or P. Oxy. II 278) is a fragment of a Hire of a Mill, in Greek. It was discovered in Oxyrhynchus. The manuscript was written on papyrus in the form of a sheet. It is dated to 26 January 17. Currently it is housed in the British Library (Department of Manuscripts, 795) in London.

== Description ==
The document was written by Isidorus and Heracleus. Lease of a mill by Isidorus to Heracleus, son of Soterichus, for seven months, at the rent of 2 drachmae 3 obols a month.

The measurements of the fragment are 344 by 119 mm. The document is mutilated.

It was discovered by Grenfell and Hunt in 1897 in Oxyrhynchus. The text was published by Grenfell and Hunt in 1899.

== See also ==
- Oxyrhynchus Papyri
