= Papyrus Oxyrhynchus 8 =

Fragment of Greek poetry from around 100 CE

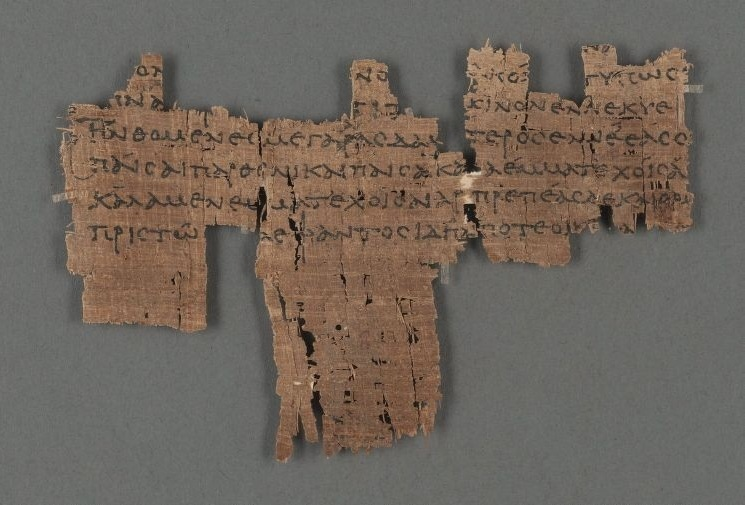
P. Oxy. 8

Papyrus Oxyrhynchus 8 (P. Oxy. 8) is a fragment of Greek hexameter poetry. The dialect is a mixture of Aeolic and Doric. It was discovered by Grenfell and Hunt in 1897 in Oxyrhynchus. The fragment is dated to the first or second century. It is housed in the Houghton Library, Harvard University, with the catalogue number SM2211. The text was published by Grenfell and Hunt in 1898.

The manuscript was written on papyrus in a form of the roll (probably). The measurements of the fragment are 61 by 109 mm. The fragment contains seven hexameter lines. The text is written in a small neat round uncial hand.

The authorship of the poem is uncertain. Friedrich Blass attributes the fragment to Alcman; Maurice Bowra suggests Erinna, and Martin Litchfield West suggests Anyte.

== See also ==
- Oxyrhynchus Papyri
- Papyrus Oxyrhynchus 7
- Papyrus Oxyrhynchus 9
