= Papyrus Oxyrhynchus 1231 =

Greek papyrus fragment

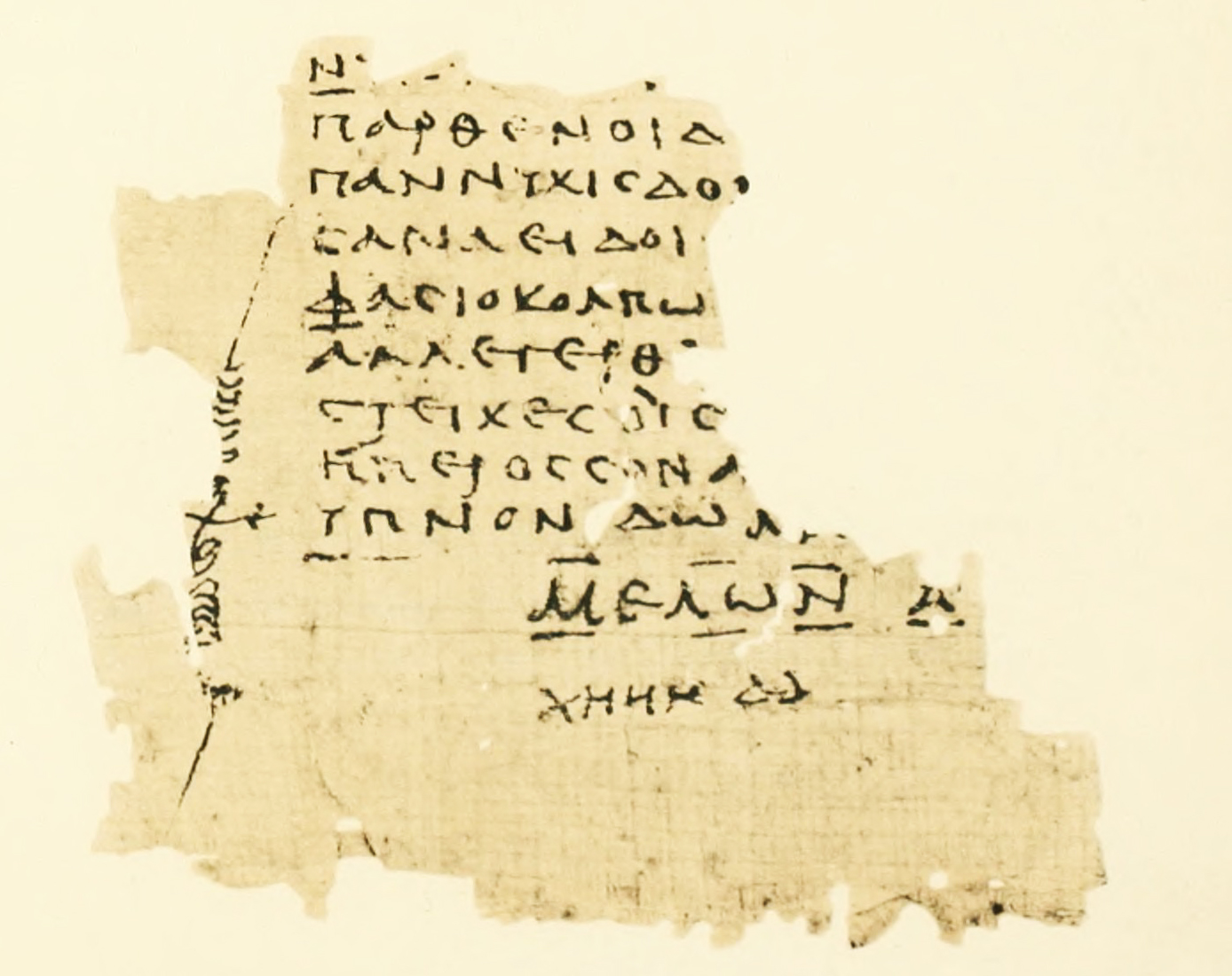
P. Oxy. 1231 fr. 56.

Papyrus Oxyrhynchus 1231 (P. Oxy. 1231 or P. Oxy. X 1231) is a papyrus discovered at Oxyrhynchus in Egypt, first published in 1914 by Bernard Pyne Grenfell and Arthur Surridge Hunt. The papyrus preserves fragments of the second half of Book I of a Hellenistic edition of the poetry of the archaic poet Sappho. (Note: Fragments 15–30 in Voigt's edition of Sappho are all preserved in this papyrus.)

The papyrus comes from a second century AD roll, and is made up of 56 smaller fragments. The largest piece, fragment one, measures 17.7 cm × 13.2 cm; it covers two columns and includes fragments of four poems. It is written in a small informal upright hand, and corrections and marginalia have been added in a second hand, using a different ink.

The papyrus preserves a number of fragments by Sappho. Fragment one of the papyrus preserves four consecutive fragments; frr. 15, 16, 17, and 18 in Voigt's edition. Also preserved, on fragment 56 of the papyrus, is the final poem of Book I of Sappho, fragment 30. A colophon at the end of fragment 56 of the papyrus shows that Sappho's Book I contained 1320 lines, or 330 stanzas. Sappho's name is not preserved here; instead, the authorship of the fragments is established by the metre (Sapphic stanzas), dialect (Aeolic), and three overlaps with previously-known fragments attributed to Sappho.

The papyrus is now in the collection of the Bodleian Library.

== See also ==
- Oxyrhynchus papyri
- Papyrus Oxyrhynchus 7

== Works cited ==
- Bierl, Anton; Lardinois, André (2016). "Introduction". In Bierl, Anton; Lardinois, André (eds.). The Newest Sappho: P. Sapph. Obbink and P. GC inv. 105, frs.1–4. Leiden: Brill. ISBN 978-90-04-31483-2.
- Grenfell, Bernard Pyne; Hunt, Arthur Surridge, eds. (1914). The Oxyrhynchus Papyri. Vol. X. London: Egypt Exploration Fund.
- Obbink, Dirk (2016a). "The Newest Sappho: Text, Apparatus Criticus, and Translation". In Bierl, Anton; Lardinois, André (eds.). The Newest Sappho: P. Sapph. Obbink and P. GC inv. 105, frs.1–4. Leiden: Brill. ISBN 978-90-04-31483-2.
- Obbink, Dirk (2016b). "Ten Poems of Sappho: Provenance, Authenticity, and Text of the New Sappho Papyri". In Bierl, Anton; Lardinois, André (eds.). The Newest Sappho: P. Sapph. Obbink and P. GC inv. 105, frs.1–4. Leiden: Brill. ISBN 978-90-04-31483-2.
- Rayor, Diane; Lardinois, André (2014). Sappho: A New Edition of the Complete Works. Cambridge: Cambridge University Press.
