= Papyrus Oxyrhynchus 286 =

Greek papyrus fragment

Papyrus Oxyrhynchus 286 (P. Oxy. 286 or P. Oxy. II 286) is a fragment of a Claim of a Creditor, in Greek. It was discovered in Oxyrhynchus. The manuscript was written on papyrus in the form of a sheet. It is dated to the 17 May 82. Currently, it is housed in the British Library (Department of Manuscripts, 797) in London.

== Description ==
The measurements of the fragment are 173 by 135 mm. The document is mutilated.

The document is a petition written by an unknown woman, and was addressed to the strategus. The writer and her mother had borrowed from a woman called Philumene the sum of 2000 drachmae on behalf of Heron, the son of Philumene. The term of the loan had expired and the writer was called for payment.

This papyrus was discovered by Grenfell and Hunt in 1897 in Oxyrhynchus. The text was published by Grenfell and Hunt in 1899.

== See also ==
- Oxyrhynchus Papyri
