= Papyrus Oxyrhynchus 266 =

Greek papyrus fragment

Papyrus Oxyrhynchus 266 (P. Oxy. 266 or P. Oxy. II 266) is a fragment of a Deed of Divorce, in Greek. It was discovered in Oxyrhynchus. The manuscript was written on papyrus in the form of a sheet. It was written between 29 August - 27 September 96. Currently it is housed in the British Library (Department of Manuscripts, 1187) in London.

== Description ==
The document is a Deed of Divorce between husband, who had been married a little over a year. Thaësis the wife, who appears as the principal party in the agreement, acknowledges to her late husband Petosarapis the receipt of her dowry of 400 drachmae of silver.

The measurements of the fragment are 156 by 146 mm. The document is much mutilated.

It was discovered by Grenfell and Hunt in 1897 in Oxyrhynchus. The text was published by Grenfell and Hunt in 1899.

== See also ==
- Oxyrhynchus Papyri
