= Papyrus Oxyrhynchus 268 =

Greek papyrus fragment

Papyrus Oxyrhynchus 268 (P. Oxy. 268 or P. Oxy. II 268) is a fragment of a Repayment of a Dowry, in Greek. It was discovered in Oxyrhynchus. The manuscript was written on papyrus in the form of a sheet. It is dated to 29 November 57. Currently it is housed in the Heidelberger Gesamtverzeichnis in Heidelberg.

== Description ==
The document is a contract by which a woman Ammonarion and her daughter Ophelous agree to accept from Antiphanes, a relative of Ammonarion's deceased husband Heracles, a certain sum of money.

The measurements of the fragment are 293 by 388 mm. The document is mutilated.

It was discovered by Grenfell and Hunt in 1897 in Oxyrhynchus. The text was published by Grenfell and Hunt in 1899.

== See also ==
- Oxyrhynchus Papyri
