= Papyrus Oxyrhynchus 246 =

Greek papyrus fragment

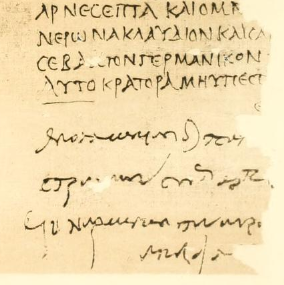
The lower part of P. Oxy. 246, showing the uncial hand of the main text and the cursive signatures of the signatory officials.

Papyrus Oxyrhynchus 246 (P. Oxy. 246 or P. Oxy. II 246) is a fragment of a registration of some sheep, written in Greek. It was discovered in Oxyrhynchus. The manuscript was written on papyrus in the form of a sheet. It is dated to 24 July 66. Currently it is housed in the Cambridge University Library (Add. Ms. 4052) in Cambridge.

== Description ==
The text is written in a fine uncial hand. It is addressed to Papiscus, the strategus, Ptolemaeus, a royal scribe, and other unnamed scribes. The author, Harmiusis, states that seven additional lambs have been born to his sheep in addition to twelve previously registered.

The document is signed in cursive by three officials: Apollonius, agent of Papiscus; Horion, agent of Ptolomaeus; and Zenon, agent of the other scribes. The measurements of the fragment are 343 by 80 mm.

It was discovered by Grenfell and Hunt in 1897 in Oxyrhynchus. The text was published by Grenfell and Hunt in 1899.

== See also ==
- Oxyrhynchus Papyri
