= Papyrus Oxyrhynchus 12 =

Ancient Greek manuscript

Papyrus Oxyrhynchus 12 (P. Oxy. 12) is a fragment of a chronological work in Greek. It was discovered by Grenfell and Hunt in 1897 in Oxyrhynchus. The fragment is dated to the first or second century. It is housed in the Cambridge University Library. The text was published by Grenfell and Hunt in 1898.

The manuscript was written on papyrus in the form of a roll. The measurements of the fragment are 210 by 555 mm. It is a chronological work giving a list of events in Greek, Roman, and Oriental history. The fragment contains two columns. The text is written in a good semi-cursive hand. The portion is dated by the Olympiads and archons at Athens. The fragment concerns the years 355-315 BC.

== See also ==
- Oxyrhynchus Papyri
- Papyrus Oxyrhynchus 11
- Papyrus Oxyrhynchus 13
