= Papyrus Oxyrhynchus 288 =

Greek papyrus fragment

Papyrus Oxyrhynchus 288 (P. Oxy. 288 or P. Oxy. II 288) is a fragment of a Taxation Account, in Greek. It was discovered in Oxyrhynchus. The manuscript was written on papyrus in the form of a sheet. It was written after 22 July 25. Currently it is housed in the British Library (Department of Manuscripts 798) in London.

== Description ==
The measurements of the fragment are 363 by 180 mm. The document is mutilated.

The document was written by Tryphon, son of Dionysius, a weaver of Oxyrhynchus. It contains a Taxation Account. The first four lines are written in a careful cursive, the rest in a larger and freer hand.

This papyrus was discovered by Grenfell and Hunt in 1897 in Oxyrhynchus. The text was published by Grenfell and Hunt in 1899.

== See also ==
- Oxyrhynchus Papyri
