= Papyrus Oxyrhynchus 15 =

Epigram fragment

Papyrus Oxyrhynchus 15 (P. Oxy. 15) is a fragment of an epigram by an unknown author, written in Greek. It was discovered by Grenfell and Hunt in 1897 in Oxyrhynchus. The fragment is dated to the third century. It is housed in the Glasgow University Library (Special Collections Department). The text was published by Grenfell and Hunt in 1898.

The manuscript was written on papyrus in the form of a roll. The measurements of the fragment are 92 by 157 mm. The text is written in an irregular and sloping uncial hand.

== See also ==
- Oxyrhynchus Papyri
- Papyrus Oxyrhynchus 14
- Papyrus Oxyrhynchus 16
