= Papyrus Oxyrhynchus 7 =

Manuscript of Greek poem

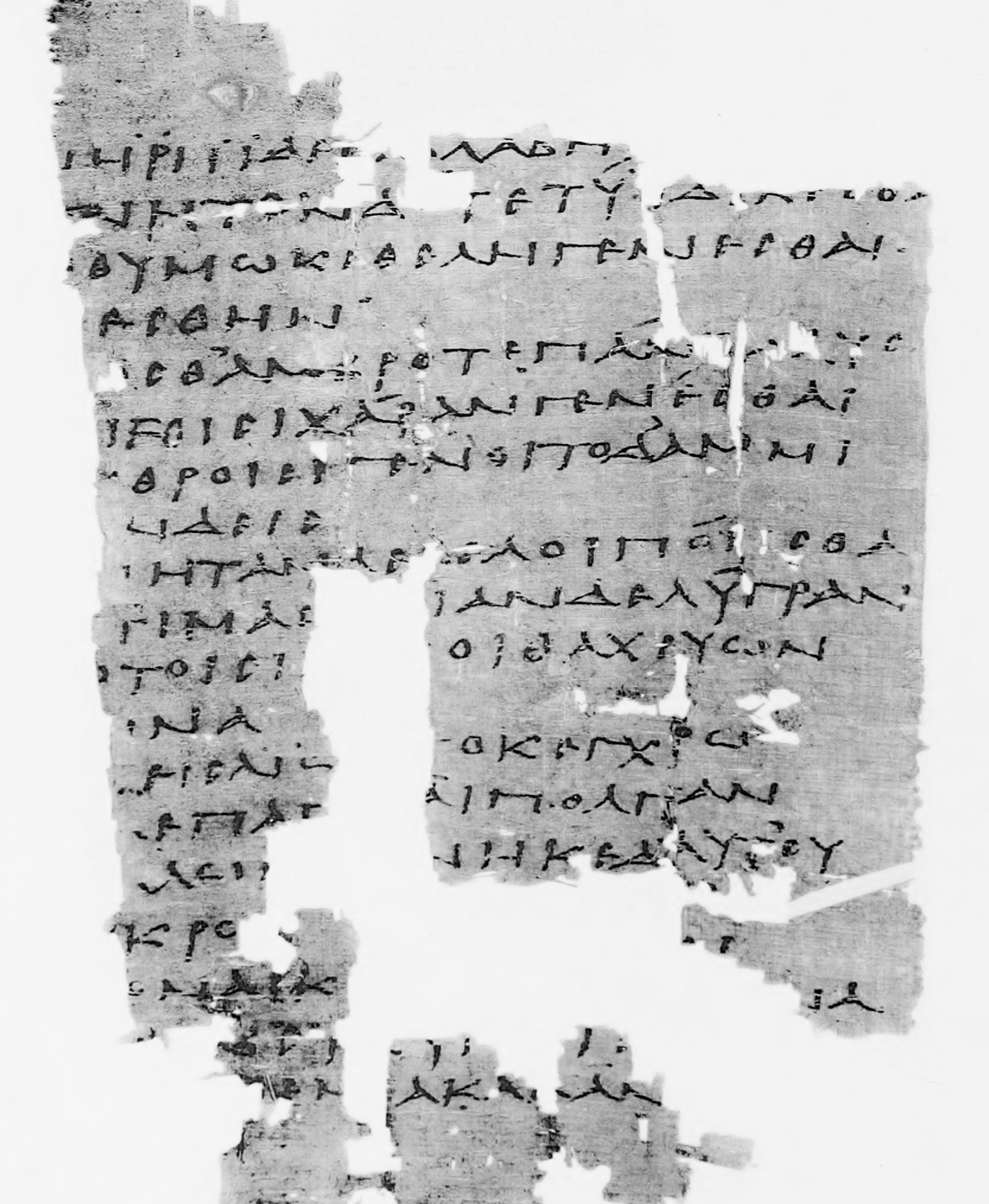
P. Oxy. 7

Papyrus Oxyrhynchus 7 (P. Oxy. 7) is a papyrus found at Oxyrhynchus in Egypt. It was discovered by Bernard Pyne Grenfell and Arthur Surridge Hunt in 1897, and published in 1898. It dates to the third century AD. The papyrus is now in the British Library.

Papyrus Oxyrhynchus 7 was the first non-biblical papyrus from the site to be published. It preserves part of a poem by the archaic Greek poet Sappho. (Note: The poem preserved is Sappho 5 in Voigt's numeration.) When the papyrus was first published, Grenfell and Hunt wrote that "it is not very likely that we shall find another poem of Sappho". In 1906, however, a major cache of literary fragments from the remains of two private libraries were discovered – the source of the majority of the Sappho fragments discovered at Oxyrhynchus.

Papyrus Oxyrhynchus 7 measures 19.7 cm × 9.6 cm, and is written in an uncial hand. Parts of twenty lines of a poem written in Sapphic stanzas survive, with one and a half feet missing from the beginning of each line.

== See also ==
- Oxyrhynchus Papyri
- Papyrus Oxyrhynchus 6
- Papyrus Oxyrhynchus 8
- Papyrus Oxyrhynchus 1231
