= Papyrus Oxyrhynchus 282 =

Greek papyrus fragment

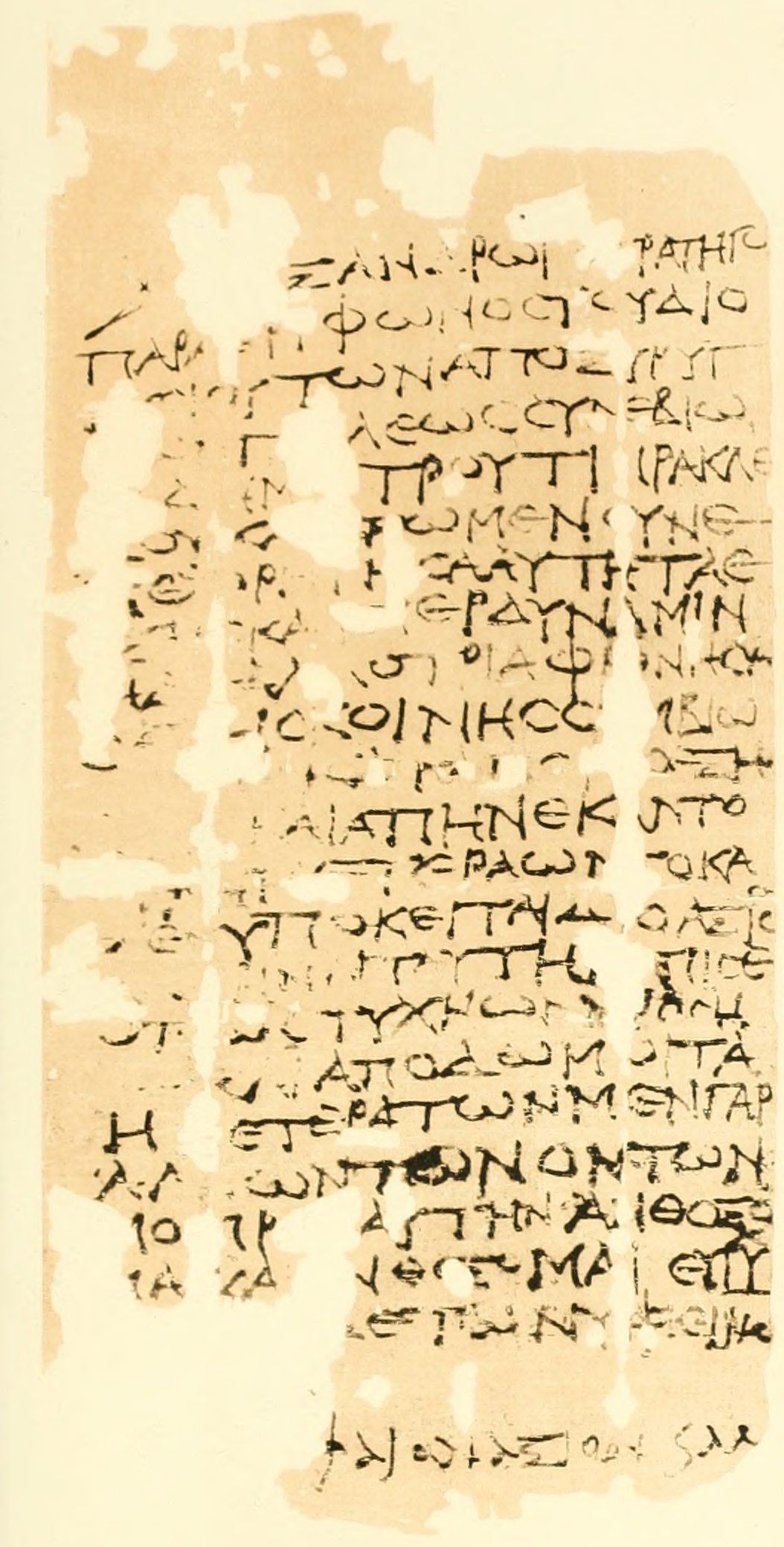
Fragmented remains of the manuscript

Papyrus Oxyrhynchus 282 (P. Oxy. 282 or P. Oxy. II 282) is a fragment of a complaint against a wife, in Greek. It was discovered in Oxyrhynchus. The manuscript, written on papyrus in the form of a sheet, is dated between 26 January 29 – 22 May 37. It is housed in the Beinecke Rare Book and Manuscript Library (P. CtYBR 40) of the Yale University in New Haven.

== Description ==
The measurements of the fragment are 175 by 97 mm. The document is mutilated.

The document was written by Tryphon, son of Dionysius, and was addressed to the strategus.

This papyrus was discovered by Grenfell and Hunt in 1897 in Oxyrhynchus. The text was published by Grenfell and Hunt in 1899.The fragment is used by palaeographers and papyrologists for dating ancient documents, which do not have dates added by their scribes. Young Kyu Kim used it to date biblical manuscript Papyrus 46 to the end of the 1st century.

== Contents ==
It is a petition addressed to the strategus by Tryphon, complaining that his wife Demetrous had left him and carried off various articles belonging to him. A list of the stolen property was added, but this part of the papyrus was lost. The document, like other Greek documents of ancient times, does not distinguish between theft and removal of husband's property, and in both cases αποφερειν is used.

Demetrous was the first wife of Tryphon (see POxy 267), who married Saraeus in the year 36. The date of papyrus, which is written in a large uncial hand.

Other surviving ancient petitions submitted by husbands are P. Heid. I. 13; PSI VIII 893; P. Cairo Preis. 2 and 3; SB XVI 12505 and 12627; P. Lond. V 1651 and possibly P. Tebt. I 51.

== See also ==
- Oxyrhynchus Papyri
- Papyrus Oxyrhynchus 281
