= Uncial 069 =

- New Testament manuscript
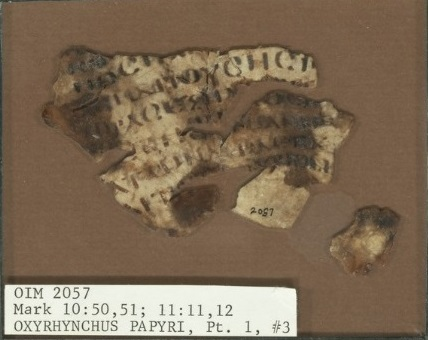
- Name: P. Oxy. 3
- Text: Mark
- Date: 5th century
- Script: Greek
- Now at: University of Chicago
- Size: 8 × 4,5 cm
- Type: Byzantine text-type
- Category: III
- Note: concurs with codex A

Uncial 069 (in the Gregory-Aland numbering), ε 12 (Soden), is a Greek uncial manuscript of the New Testament, dated paleographically to the 5th century.

== Description ==
The codex contains very small part of the Gospel of Mark 10:50.51; 11:11.12, on one parchment leaf (8 cm by 4.5 cm). The text is written in one column per page, 25 lines per page, 11-15 letters in line, in a calligraphic uncial hand. The letters A and M are not typical Egyptian.

The nomina sacra are written in an abbreviated way.

== Text ==
The Greek text of the codex is a representative of the Byzantine text-type. Aland placed it in Category III. It concurs with Codex Alexandrinus, and the parts preserved support the Textus Receptus reading at all nine points of variation from other early uncials. It could be a member of the Family Π. The text is too brief for certainty.

Recto ιμ]ΑΤΙΟN [αυτου α]ΝΑΣΤΑΣΗΛ ΘΕΝΠΡΟΣΤΟΝΙΝ ΚΑΙΑΠΟΚΡΙΘΕΙΣΛε[?] ΓΕΙΑΥΤΩΟΙΣΤΙΘ[ε] ΛΕΙΣΠΟΙΗΣΩΣΟ[ι] ΟΔΕΤΥΦΛΟΣΕΙ[πεν]	Verso ΚΑΙ[περι βλεψαμε] ΝΟΣΠΑΝ[τα οψι] ΑΣΗΔΗΟΥΣΗΣΤΗ[ς] ΩΡΑΣΕΞΗΛΘΕΝ ΕΙΣ ΒΗΘΑΝΙΑΝ ΜΕ [τ]ΑΤΩΝΔΩΔΕΚΑ [k]ΑΙΤΗΕΠΑΥΡΙΟΝ

== History ==
Currently the manuscript is dated by the INTF to the 5th century.

The manuscript was discovered by the Egyptologist Bernard Grenfell (1869-1926) and the Papyrologist Arthur Hunt (1871-1934). It was presented to the University of Chicago in the early 20th century.

Present location

The codex now is located at the Oriental Institute (2057) in University of Chicago.

== See also ==
- List of New Testament uncials
- Textual criticism
- Oxyrhynchus Papyri
- Papyrus Oxyrhynchus 2
- Papyrus Oxyrhynchus 4
