= Papyrus Oxyrhynchus 285 =

Greek papyrus fragment

Papyrus Oxyrhynchus 285 (P. Oxy. 285 or P. Oxy. II 285) is a fragment of an Extortion by a Tax-Collector, in Greek. It was discovered in Oxyrhynchus. The manuscript was written on papyrus in the form of a sheet. It is dated to the year about 50. Currently it is housed in the British Library (Department of Manuscripts, 796) in London.

== Description ==
The measurements of the fragment are 244 by 98 mm. The document is mutilated.

The document is a petition was written by Sarapion, son of Theon, a weaver from Oxyrhynchus, and was addressed to the strategus Tiberius Claudius Pasion.

This papyrus was discovered by Grenfell and Hunt in 1897 in Oxyrhynchus. The text was published by Grenfell and Hunt in 1899.

== See also ==
- Oxyrhynchus Papyri
