= Papyrus Oxyrhynchus 283 =

Greek manuscript

Papyrus Oxyrhynchus 283 (P. Oxy. 283 or P. Oxy. II 283) is a fragment of a Petition to a Strategus, in Greek. It was discovered in Oxyrhynchus. The manuscript was written on papyrus in the form of a sheet. It is dated to 8 August 45. Currently it is housed in the City Museum (H 3685) in Bristol.

== Description ==
The measurements of the fragment are 120 by 161 mm. The document is mutilated.

The document was written by Sarapion and was addressed to the strategus Tiberius Claudius Pasion.

This papyrus was discovered by Grenfell and Hunt in 1897 in Oxyrhynchus. The text was published by Grenfell and Hunt in 1899.

== See also ==
- Oxyrhynchus Papyri
