= Papyrus Oxyrhynchus 254 =

Greek fragmentary census return manuscript

Papyrus Oxyrhynchus 254 (P. Oxy. 254 or P. Oxy. II 254) is a fragment of a census return, in Greek. It was discovered in Oxyrhynchus. The manuscript was written on papyrus in the form of a sheet. It is dated to the years 13–26. Currently it is housed in the Union Theological Seminary (Rare Book Library) in New York City.

== Description ==
It was written by Horion and was addressed to the officials. The measurements of the fragment are 130 by 113 mm. The text is written in an uncial hand.

It was discovered by Grenfell and Hunt in 1897 in Oxyrhynchus. The text was published by Grenfell and Hunt in 1899.

== See also ==
- Oxyrhynchus Papyri
