= Papyrus Oxyrhynchus 245 =

Greek papyrus fragment from Oxyrhynchus

Papyrus Oxyrhynchus 245 (P. Oxy. 245 or P. Oxy. II 245) is a fragment describing the registration of some cattle, written in Greek. It was discovered in Oxyrhynchus. The manuscript was written on papyrus in the form of a sheet. It is dated to 26 January 26. Currently it is housed in the University of Pennsylvania (E 2759) in Philadelphia.

== Description ==
The document was written by two scribes, Heracleus, son of Apion, and Naris, son of Colluthus the elder. The authors state that they are returning twelve sheep, which they owe, in the twelfth year of Tiberius and further announce their intention to pay the proper taxes on the sheep and provide a shepherd to care for them. The measurements of the fragment are 37 by 7 cm.

The text is written in an upright uncial hand. It is addressed to the strategus, Chaereas (see P. Oxy. 244). The formula used in this document occurs in P. Oxy. 350–P. Oxy. 356.

It was discovered by Grenfell and Hunt in 1897 in Oxyrhynchus. The text was published by Grenfell and Hunt in 1899.

== See also ==
- Oxyrhynchus Papyri
