= Papyrus Oxyrhynchus 291 =

Fragment of a letter of a Strategus in Greek

Papyrus Oxyrhynchus 291 (P. Oxy. 291 or P. Oxy. II 291) is a fragment of a Letter of a Strategus, in Greek. It was discovered in Oxyrhynchus. The manuscript was written on papyrus in the form of a sheet. It was written between 25 and 26. Currently it is housed in the British Library (Department of Manuscripts 800) in London.

== Description ==
The measurements of the fragment are 230 by 150 mm. The document is mutilated.

The document was written by Chaereas and was addressed to Tyrannus. It contains a Letter of a Strategus, with a reference to certain details of financial administration.

The text is written in a fine, bold, semi-uncial hand, with an unusual tendency to separation of words. P.Oxy 292 is of the same handwriting. Probably it was written by a professional scribe attached to the strategus.

This papyrus was discovered by Grenfell and Hunt in 1897 in Oxyrhynchus. The text was published by Grenfell and Hunt in 1899.

== See also ==
- Oxyrhynchus Papyri
