= Jane Brownlow =

British educator and suffragist

- Born: 1854/55; Paisley, Scotland
- Died: 14 November 1928; London, England
- Spouse: Captain Edward Brownlow

Jane Macnaughton Egerton Brownlow (née Morgan; 1854/55 – 14 November 1928) was a British educationist, writer, translator and suffragist.

== Biography ==
Brownlow was born in Paisley in 1854 or 1855 to Lt.-Col. George Bernard Morgan and Jane Macnaughton. Her father was in the military and he was the town major in Gibraltar. She married at the King's Chapel, Gibraltar, Captain Edward Francis Brownlow on 20 August 1872. Her husband had served in India and was in the 71st Highland Regiment. She was in Gibraltar until her husband died in 1875, when she moved to England.

She was outspoken on the subject of women's rights and suffrage. In 1891, she was in charge of an elementary school in Finsbury where she was surprised at the poor education for working-class girls. In a letter in the June 1896 issue of the feminist magazine Shafts, she noted that women did not attend printing and bookbinding classes provided by the Technical Education Committee of the London County Council because "powerful men's organisations ... refuse to allow their members to work where women are employed." Women wanting to enter the printing and bookbinding trades were further victimized by "[t]he provisions of the Technical Education Act, framed by men in the interests of men, [which] make it impossible for instruction to be given in any trade to persons not already working at that trade. This practically excludes the greater number of young women who are already so cruelly handicapped by prejudice."

She took an interest in the working conditions of women and children. She noted that the laws to restrict the night work of men rarely covered professions like dancing or nursing and other professions associated with women. She was asked by the Women's Trade Union League to sit on a committee that was to look at the role of wage earning children and to advise on reform. Other members included socialist Margaret Macdonald and Ruth Homan.

Brownlow was a member of the feminist Pioneer Club, the Fabian Society, the Humanitarian League, the Teachers' Guild and the Women's Liberal Federation. She was also an active member of the Women's Franchise League, travelling in 1895 to meet other committee members including Ursula Bright, Herbert Burrows, Jane Cobden Unwin and Dr and Mrs Pankhurst in Aberystwyth. The following year she seconded a motion at the Women's Liberal Federation to remove the support of Liberal candidates who opposed women's suffrage. This idea was the central theme of the Women's Progressive Society to which Brownlow belonged. The proposal caused, but was lost after, an acrimonious debate. Brownlow was later quoted at a public debate as saying, "I will not lift a finger to help any man who will not help my sisters".

Brownlow died in London in 1928.

== Works ==
- Women's Work in Local Government, England and Wales. London: David Nutt, 1911
- The English Woman: Studies in her Psychic Evolution by David Staars was translated & abridged by Brownlow from French in 1909 (London: Smith, Elder, 1909)
- Women and Factory Legislation. London: Women's Printing Society, 1896 (a pamphlet)
