= Papyrus Oxyrhynchus 284 =

1st-century manuscript

Papyrus Oxyrhynchus 284 (P. Oxy. 284 or P. Oxy. II 284) is a fragment of an Extortion by a Tax-Collector, in Greek. It was discovered in Oxyrhynchus. The manuscript was written on papyrus in the form of a sheet. It is dated to the year about 50. Currently it is housed in the Houghton Library (SM 2219) of the Harvard University in Cambridge.

== Description ==
The measurements of the fragment are 120 by 161 mm. The document is mutilated.

The document was written by Alexandros, a weaver of Oxyrhynchus, and was addressed to the strategus Tiberius Claudius Pasion. The document states, that a tax-collector, Apollophanes, had unjustly compelled him (i.e. author of this document) to pay 16 drachmae in the year 47-48.

This papyrus was discovered by Grenfell and Hunt in 1897 in Oxyrhynchus. The text was published by Grenfell and Hunt in 1899.

== See also ==
- Oxyrhynchus Papyri
