= Papyrus Oxyrhynchus 293 =

Greek papyrus fragment

Papyrus Oxyrhynchus 293 (P. Oxy. 293 or P. Oxy. II 293) is a fragment of a Letter to a Sister, in Greek. It was discovered in Oxyrhynchus. The manuscript was written on papyrus in the form of a sheet. It was written at 15 November 27. Currently it is housed in the library of the Columbia University (Rare Book & Manuscript Library) in New York City.

== Description ==
The measurements of the fragment are 230 by 127 mm.

The document was written by Dionysius and was addressed to his sister Didyme. Dionysius asked his sister about some clothes.

This papyrus was discovered by Grenfell and Hunt in 1897 in Oxyrhynchus. The text was published by Grenfell and Hunt in 1899.

== See also ==
- Oxyrhynchus Papyri
