= Alice Grenfell =

Bristol suffrage organiser and scarab expert

- Born: Alice Pyne; 1842
- Died: 8 August 1917 (aged 74–75); Oxford, England
- Known for: study of scarabs from ancient Egypt
- Children: Bernard Pyne Grenfell

Alice Grenfell or Alice Pyne (1842 – 8 August 1917) was a British suffrage organiser and honorary secretary of the Women's Progressive Society. In later life she became an expert on ancient Egyptian scarabs.

== Life ==
Grenfell married John Granville Grenfell. Their son, Bernard, was born in Birmingham but he was brought up and educated at Clifton College in Bristol, where John taught.

Grenfell was active in the suffrage movement. She was in America in 1888 attending the inaugural meeting of the International Council of Women in Washington with Susan B. Anthony. She became the honorary secretary of the Women's Progressive Society.

Grenfell served on a school board for three years.

Grenfell went to live with her son after her husband died in 1897. Her son was a leading papyrologist working with Arthur Surridge Hunt. She took a great interest in her son's work and in particular Egyptian scarab-shaped artefacts. She taught herself to read hieroglyphics and published her own papers including, The Iconography of Bes, and of Phoenician Bes-Hand Scarabs in 1902. She created a catalogue of the Grenfell family's and the scarab collection belonging to The Queen's College, Oxford. This collection had been left to the college by Robert Mason but it had been gathered by the Italian explorer Giovanni Battista Belzoni.

In 1908, Bernard became professor of papyrology at Oxford University, however he was ill and Alice cared for him for four years. During that time the professorship lapsed. He had recovered by 1913. Alice Grenfell died in Oxford in 1917.

Her son died on 18 May 1926, and was buried in Holywell Cemetery, Oxford.

== Works include ==
- The Iconography of Bes, and of Phoenician Bes-Hand Scarabs, 1902
- The Grenfell Collection of Scarabs, 1916
