= Papyrus Oxyrhynchus 267 =

Greek papyrus fragment

Papyrus Oxyrhynchus 267 (P. Oxy. 267 or P. Oxy. II 267) is a fragment of an Agreement of Marriage in Greek. It was discovered in Oxyrhynchus. The manuscript was written on papyrus in the form of a sheet. It is dated to 22 May 37. Currently it is housed in the Milton S. Eisenhower Library (267 EEF/Goodwin*) of the Johns Hopkins University in Baltimore.

== Description ==
The measurements of the fragment are 365 by 185 mm. The document is mutilated. It was signed by four hands. According to Grenfell and Hunt it was written on 22 May of 36.

The fragment was discovered by Grenfell and Hunt in 1897 in Oxyrhynchus. The text was published by Grenfell and Hunt in 1899. Since 1904 it is housed in the Johns Hopkins University. Basil Lanneau Gildersleeve, professor of Greek, was involved in this acquisition.

The document relates to the terms of a marriage. It was written by Tryphon, son of Dionysius, to Saraeus, daughter of Appion, his second wife. It is concerned almost entirely with the dowry of Saraeus, consisting of a sum of 40 drachmae of silver and a robe and a pair of gold earrings which are together valued at 32 drachmae. This dowry Tryphon acknowledges that he has received, and promises to return it unconditionally on October 27 of 37. The agreement was dated by Tryphon to May 22 of 37 CE. There are other regulations in case of a separation the value of the gold earrings was to be made up to their present worth. Tryphon was also obliged to make to Saraeus an allowance of some kind if the separation was succeeded by the birth of a child.

There are more Oxyrhynchus papyri relating to the affairs of Tryphon and they throw more light upon the subject. Tryphon in 54 CE purchased a loom at Oxyrhynchos.

== See also ==
- Oxyrhynchus Papyri
- Papyrus Oxyrhynchus 282
