= Papyrus Oxyrhynchus 271 =

Greek papyrus fragment

Papyrus Oxyrhynchus 271 (P. Oxy. 271 or P. Oxy. II 271) is a fragment of a Transfer of a Debt, in Greek. It was discovered in Oxyrhynchus. The manuscript was written on papyrus in the form of a sheet. It was written after 26 August 56. Currently it is housed in the Houghton Library of the Harvard University in Cambridge.

== Description ==
The document is a contract between Heraclea, with her guardian Nicippus, son of Nicippus, a member of the Althacan deme, and Papontos, by the terms of which Heraclea makes over to Papontos the right of execution on account of a sum of 200 drachmae which was due to her, in consideration of having received from Papontos the 200 drachmae with interest.

The measurements of the fragment are 376 by 200 mm. The document is mutilated.

It was discovered by Grenfell and Hunt in 1897 in Oxyrhynchus. The text was published by Grenfell and Hunt in 1899.

== See also ==
- Oxyrhynchus Papyri
