= Jean Bingen =

Belgian papyrologist and epigrapher

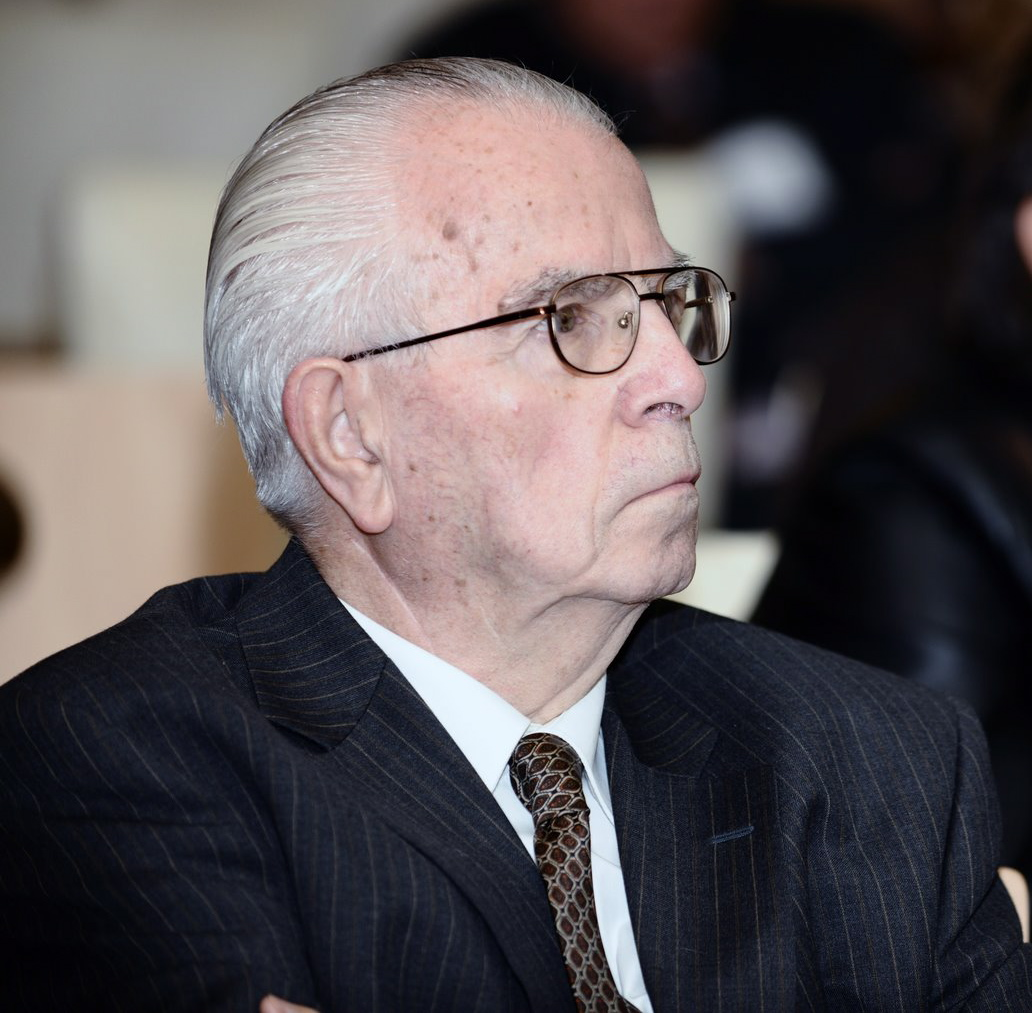
- Born: Jean, François, Henri, Emmanuel Bingen; 26 March 1920; Antwerp
- Died: 6 February 2012 (aged 91); Woluwé-Saint-Pierre
- Occupations: Papyrologist; Epigrapher

Jean Bingen (26 March 1920 – 6 February 2012) was a Belgian papyrologist and epigrapher, specialized in Greek and Roman history and civilizations, especially ancient Egypt, economic history of Ptolemaic Egypt (Papyrus Revenue Laws), Greek papyrology and epigraphy (notably ostraca from El Kab), Greek and Roman archaeology (Alba Fucens, Argos, Delphi, Thorikos, El Kab), Greek and Latin epigraphy (in Greece, particularly Attica, Delphi, Peloponnese and Thorikos; Egypt), Greek (Thorikos) and Roman (El Kab) numismatics, Greek philology and literature (Menander).

== Publications (selection) ==
- 1952: Papyrus Revenue Laws.
- 1952: Les Roettiers, graveurs en médailles des Pays-Bas méridionaux.
- 1960–1964: Menander. Dyscolos.
- 1968: Choix de papyrus grecs. Essai de traitement automatique (in collaboration).
- 1977: Au temps où on lisait le grec en Égypte. Catalogue de l’exposition de papyrus et d’ostraca.
- 1978: Le papyrus Revenue Laws. Tradition grecque et adaptation hellénistique.
- 1989: Fouilles d’Elkab. III, les ostraca grecs (O. Elkab gr.).
- 1991: Pages d’épigraphie grecque. Attique-Égypte (1952-1982).
- Mons Claudianus. Ostraca graeca et latina I (O. Claud. 1 à 190), in collaboration with A. Bülow-Jacobsen, W. E. H. Cockle, H. Cuvigny, L. Rubinstein and W. Van Rengen.
- 1992–1997: Mons Claudianus. Ostraca graeca et latina II (O. Claud. 191 à 416), in collaboration with A. Bülow-Jacobsen, W. E. H. Cockle, H. Cuvigny, Fr. Kayser and W. Van Rengen.
- 2005: Pages d'épigraphie grecque II Égypte (1983–2002)
- 2007: Hellenistic Egypt: Monarchy, Society, Economy, Culture, transl. by R. Bagnall.

== See also ==
- Mons Claudianus
