= Frances Swiney =

British suffragette (1847–1922)

- Born: Rosa Frances Emily Biggs; 21 April 1847; Poona, British India
- Died: 2 May 1922 (aged 75); Cheltenham, Gloucestershire, England
- Occupations: Writer, Theosophist, Feminist
- Spouse: John Swiney (m. 1871–1918) his death
- Children: 6

Rosa Frances Emily Swiney (née Biggs; 21 April 1847 – 3 May 1922) was an early British feminist, writer, eugenicist, and theosophist.

== Early life and family ==
Rosa Frances Emily Biggs was born in Poona, India, but spent most of her childhood in Ireland. In 1871 she married Major John Swiney (1832–1918), and devoted herself to becoming a full-time wife and mother. They had six children together: four boys and two girls.

Swiney relocated to Cheltenham, Gloucestershire, in 1877, in order to send three of her children to school in England. She described Cheltenham later in her life as "the town of no ideals", where her husband joined her ten years later.

== Activism ==
=== Feminism ===
Since 1890, Swiney was a feminist activist, lecturer, and writer in Cheltenham. She co-founded the Cheltenham Women's Suffrage Society (Cheltenham WSS) in 1896; was Vice President of the Cheltenham Food Reform and Health Association; and lectured in organisations such as the Higher Thought Centre in London, Theosophical lodges and Ethical Societies. Swiney was also a member of the Theosophical Society (TS), the Sociological Society, the National Union of Women Workers (NUWW), the Eugenics Education Society, the Secular Education League, the Primrose League, the Woman's Freedom League (WFL), and the National Woman's Social and Political Union (WSPU), as well as of the council of the Woman's Branch of the International Neo-Malthusian League. In 1913, Swiney was assaulted during a speech to a crowd in Cheltenham.

Swiney was personally connected to various prominent figures of her time, such as Charlotte Despard, Harriet McIlquham, Charlotte Stopes, Margaret Sibthorpe, Elizabeth Clarke Wolstenholme-Elmy, and Annie Besant.

Since 1910, her books were co-published by the League of Isis, which she founded in 1909. The League of Isis aimed to bring about "the betterment of the Race, by individual observance of the Natural Law of reproduction (...) for the building up of the Higher Self". This organisation, together with her writings, reflects a deep engagement in theosophical teachings: the belief in a spiritual evolution and in the Divine Mother (Isis), as well as the convincement that Theosophy can overcome the boundaries between science and religion.

=== Theosophy and motherhood ===
Contemporary conceptions of motherhood and race strongly influenced Swiney. Like other feminists at the time, she reversed the negative connotations of womanhood and motherhood and used them to fight for women's enfranchisement. Swiney claimed justice for women as "aiders in creating the wealth of the nation and as mothers of the race". Swiney's feminist emphasis on motherhood, race, and evolution also influenced her interpretations of Theosophy. This is the reason why Swiney focussed on one aspect of theosophical thought: the Divine Feminineas personated by the Goddess Isis, and her role in the cosmic process. Herein, Swiney's theosophical concepts differ from mainstream Theosophy.

The Mother, then, is the Supreme Unity, uniting all in Herself. It is not difficult why in the eternal sequence of things in evolution the human race is awakening to the truth of the Divine Feminine in the present stage of the world history. (...) Relatively speaking, the race, still in its immature youth, expelled the Mother from the nursery, and anarchy and chaos prevailed, (...). The evolved soul has always known that this intense craving for union once more with the Feminine Principle must be the first sign of the regenerate heart.

For her, the Divine Mother was oneness of the sublime cause, and all emanation would derive from her and return to her in the end of the circled cosmic process:

For the soul is the feminine creative principle in man (...). The Feminine is therefore the inner nature of man, and woman (...), the objective representative of the Divine Feminine.

== Death ==
Swiney died on 2 May 1922 in Cheltenham, Gloucestershire, aged 75. She was buried in Leckhampton's village churchyard.

== Writings ==
- The Plea of Disfranchised Women (Cheltenham: Shenton, 1896)
- The Awakening of Women, or, Woman's Part in Evolution (London: George Redway, 1899)
- The Cosmic Procession or The Feminine Principle in Evolution (London: Ernest Bell, 1906)
- The Bar of Isis (London: The Open Road Publishing, 1907)
- The Mystery of the Circle and the Cross (London: Open Road Publ., 1908)
- The Esoteric Teaching of the Gnostics (London: Yellon, Williams & Co., 1909)
- Racial Poisons (Cheltenham: League of Isis, 1910–12)
- Racial Problems (Cheltenham: League of Isis, 1910–14)
- Woman and Natural Law (London: C.W. Daniel, 1912)
- Responsibilities of Fatherhood (Cheltenham: League of Isis, 1912)
- 'Our Indian Sisters', Racial Pamphlets No. 12 (Cheltenham: League of Isis or the Law of the Mother, 1914)
- The Ancient Road, or, The Development of the Soul (London: Bell and Sons, 1918)

== See also ==
- List of suffragists and suffragettes
