= Papyrus Oxyrhynchus 294 =

Greek papyrus fragment

Papyrus Oxyrhynchus 294 (P. Oxy. 294 or P. Oxy. II 294) is a letter from Alexandria, in Greek. It was discovered in Oxyrhynchus. The manuscript was written on papyrus in the form of a sheet. It was written on 11 December 22. Currently it is housed in the Princeton University Library (AM 4402) in Princeton.

== Description ==
The measurements of the fragment are 231 by 130 mm.

The document was written by Sarapion, and addressed to his brother Dorion. It was written in the context of an upcoming court trial in which Sarapion was involved, where he had received news that his house had been searched in his absence. He was writing to seek written confirmation from Dorion about the house search, upon which he would petition the prefect. He also disclosed some of his thinking as regards strategy to navigate the upcoming trial.

This papyrus was discovered by Grenfell and Hunt in 1897 in Oxyrhynchus. The text was published by Grenfell and Hunt in 1899.

== See also ==
- Oxyrhynchus Papyri
