= Acts of Paul and Thecla =

Apocryphal story of Paul the apostle's influence on a young virgin named Thecla

The Acts of Paul and Thecla (Latin: Acta Pauli et Theclae) is an apocryphal text describing Saint Paul's influence on a young virgin named Thecla. It is one of the writings of the New Testament apocrypha.

== History of the text ==
It is attested no earlier than Tertullian, De baptismo 17:5 (c. 190), who says that a presbyter from Asia wrote the History of Paul and Thecla, and was deposed after confessing that he wrote it. Eugenia of Rome in the reign of Commodus (180–192) is reported in the Acts of her martyrdom to have taken Thecla as her model after reading the text, prior to its disapproval by Tertullian. Jerome recounts the information from Tertullian, and on account of his exactitude in reporting on chronology, some scholars regard the text as a 1st-century creation.

Many surviving versions of the Acts of Paul and Thecla in Greek, and some in Coptic, as well as references to the work among Church Fathers, show that it was widely disseminated. In the Eastern Church, the wide circulation of the Acts of Paul and Thecla in Greek, Syriac, and Armenian is evidence of the veneration of Thecla of Iconium. There are also Latin, Coptic, and Ethiopic versions, sometimes differing widely from the Greek. "In the Ethiopic, with the omission of Thecla's admitted claim to preach and to baptize, half the point of the story is lost."

The Thecla narrative is also contained in a Coptic text of the Acts of Paul, which was prepared and published by German Coptologist Carl Schmidt in Heidelberg in the early 20th century.

== Narrative of the text ==
The author set this story during Paul the Apostle's First Missionary Journey, but this text is ideologically different from the New Testament portrayal of Paul in the Acts of the Apostles and the Pauline Epistles.

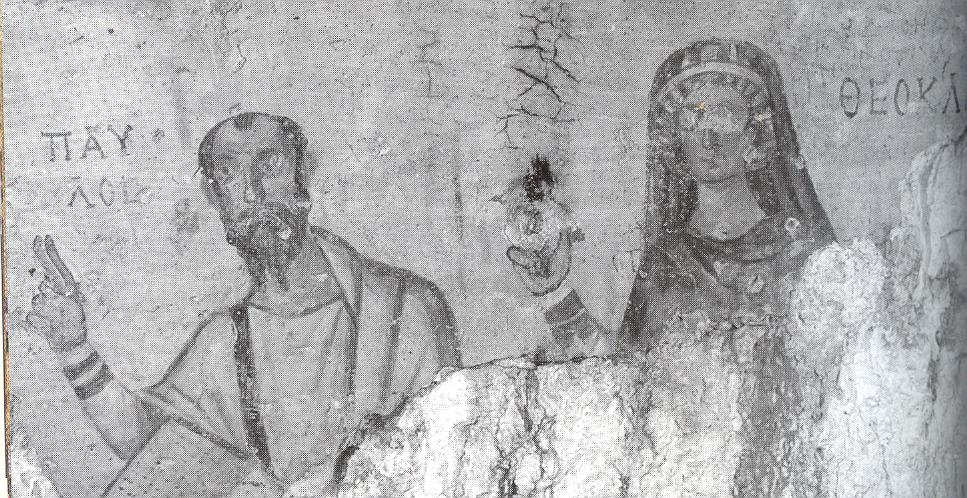
6th-century fresco near Ephesus depicting Paul and Theoclia (mother of Thecla)

The Acts of Paul and Thecla was written near the end of the second century and reflects controversial early Christian views on women's leadership and roles. Although it reflects early Christian views, most churches do not accept this as part of the authorized biblical canon. The story includes dramatic and unusual events, like Thecla surviving wild animals, baptizing herself, and Paul encouraging her to preach and act as an apostle. Even though the story was very popular at the time, early Christian leaders did not accept it as part of the official biblical canon.

In the Acts of Paul and Thecla, Paul travels to Iconium (Acts 13:51), proclaiming "the word of God about abstinence and the resurrection." Paul is given a full physical description that may reflect oral tradition. In the Syriac text, "he was a man of middling size, and his hair was scanty, and his legs were a little crooked, and his knees were projecting, and he had large eyes and his eyebrows met, and his nose was somewhat long, and he was full of grace and mercy; at one time he seemed like a man, and at another time he seemed like an angel."

While in Iconium, Paul gave his sermons in the house of Onesiphorus (cf. 2Tim 1:16) in a series of beatitudes. Thecla, a young noble virgin, heard Paul preaching from her window in an adjacent house. She listened without moving for days. Thecla's mother, Theocleia, and her fiancé, Thamyris, became concerned that Thecla would follow Paul's demand "that one must fear only one God and live in chastity," and they formed a mob to drag Paul to the governor, who imprisoned the apostle. At her mother's request, Paul was sentenced to scourging and expulsion (cf. Acts 14:19, 2 Timothy 3:11 refers to Paul, but not specifically Thecla), and Thecla to be killed by being burned at the stake, so that "all the women who have been taught by this man may be afraid." Stripped naked, Thecla was put on the fire, but she was saved when God sent a miraculous storm to put out the flames.

According to apocryphal sources, Thecla and Paul reunited outside Iconium, where she told him, "I will cut my hair off, and I shall follow you wherever you go." The two then traveled to Pisidian Antioch (cf. Acts 14:21), where a nobleman named Alexander desired Thecla and offered Paul money for her. Paul claimed not to know her, and Alexander then attempted to take Thecla by force. Thecla fought him off, assaulting him in the process, to the amusement of the townspeople. Alexander dragged her before the governor for assaulting a nobleman, and, despite the protests of the city's women, Thecla was sentenced to be eaten by wild beasts. To ensure that her virtue would still be intact at her death, Queen Antonia Tryphaena took her into protective custody overnight.

The next day, Thecla was tied to a fierce lioness and paraded through the city. Though some condemned her for being sacrilegious, other women in the city protested the injustice of her sentence. Still, Thecla was stripped naked and thrown into an arena, where the lioness protected her from a bear and died while killing a lion that belonged to Alexander. Believing that the day in the arena would be her last chance to baptize herself, Thecla jumped into a vat of water that contained ravenous seals (or sea-calves, in some versions of the story). A miracle killed all the seals by lightning before they could eat her. Further miracles occurred during Thecla's trial when the perfumes of the women in the arena hypnotized the wild beasts so they wouldn't hurt Thecla, and when fire spared her from raging bulls. Thecla was freed when Queen Tryphaena fainted and Alexander begged the governor for mercy, believing that the queen was dead. The governor heard Thecla speak about the Christian God, ordered her clothed, and released her to the rejoicing women of the city.

In Myra, Thecla returned to Paul unharmed and "wearing a mantle that she had altered so as to make a man's cloak." She later returned to Iconium to convert her mother. She went to live in Seleucia Cilicia. According to some versions of the Acts, she lived in a cave there for 72 years, becoming a healer. The Hellenistic physicians in the city lost their livelihood and solicited young men to rape Thecla at the age of 90. As they were about to take her, a new passage opened in the cave and the stones closed behind her. She was also able to go to Rome and lie beside Paul's tomb. Some traditions also assert that Thecla journeyed to Rome near the end of her life, where she sought to pay homage to Paul by visiting his tomb. In certain versions of the narrative, she was said to have been buried beside him, underscoring her spiritual equality with the apostle and cementing her legacy as one of the earliest and most influential female figures in Christian history.

== See also ==
- Acts of Paul
- Acts of Peter and Paul
- Leucius Charinus
- Papyrus Oxyrhynchus 6

== Bibliography ==
- Translation, in Elliott, J.K. The Apocryphal New Testament: A Collection of Apocryphal Christian Literature in an English Translation. Oxford: Oxford University Press. 1993.
- Elliott, J. K. (Trans.) (2003). "The Acts of Paul and Thecla" (PDF). In Ehrman, Bart D. (ed.). The New Testament and Other Early Christian Writings: A Reader. Oxford University Press. pp. 177–182. ISBN 9780195154641.
- Barrier, Jeremy W. The Acts of Paul and Thecla: A Critical Introduction and Commentary. Tübingen: Mohr Siebeck. 2009.
- MacDonald, Dennis Ronald. The Legend and the Apostle: The Battle for Paul in Story and Canon. Philadelphia: Westminster Press. 1983.
- M^{c}Ginn, Sheila E. “Acts of Thecla.” In Elisabeth Schüssler Fiorenza, ed., Searching the Scriptures, Vol. 2: A Feminist Commentary. New York: Crossroad. 1994. 800–828.
- Kirsch, J. P. Sts. Thecla. The Catholic Encyclopedia, Volume XIV. New York: Robert Appleton Company. 1912.
- Ehrman, Bart D. Lost Christianities: The Battles for Scripture and the Faiths We Never Knew. Oxford: Oxford University Press. 2005. ISBN 978-0-19-518249-1.
- Streete, Gail C. Redeemed Bodies: Women Martyrs in Early Christianity. Louisville: Westminster John Knox Press, 2009. ISBN 978-0-664-23329-7. Thecla Coffey.
