= Papyrus Oxyrhynchus 247 =

First-century Greek manuscript fragment

Papyrus Oxyrhynchus 247 (P. Oxy. 247 or P. Oxy. II 247) is a fragment of a registration of some property, written in Greek. It was discovered in Oxyrhynchus. The manuscript was written on papyrus in the form of a sheet. It is dated to 10 March 90. Currently it is housed in the Glasgow University Library in Glasgow, Scotland.

== Description ==
The document was written by Panechotes on behalf of his younger brother. It is addressed to the keepers of the archives, Theon and Epimachus. It concerns a one third share is a double-towered house in the city of Oxyrhynchus. The measurements of the fragment are 350 by 88 mm. The text is written in an uncial hand.

It was discovered by Grenfell and Hunt in 1897 in Oxyrhynchus. The text was published by Grenfell and Hunt in 1899.

== See also ==
- Oxyrhynchus Papyri
