= Papyrus Revenue Laws =

Set of regulations on farm taxes

A famous papyrus published at the end of the 19th century by Bernard Pyne Grenfell, the papyrus Revenue Laws is a comprehensive set of regulations on farm taxes in the reign of Ptolemy II Philadelphus (283–246), more precisely for the year –259/–258. This document contains tax regulations for the understanding of how Ptolemy II Philadelphus organized a sophisticated command economy.

== Bibliography ==
There exists two editions of this text:

- Bernard Pyne Grenfell, Revenue Laws of Ptolemy Philadelphus, Oxford, 1896.
- Jean Bingen, Papyrus Revenue Laws, Göttingen, 1952.

Studies:

- Jean Bingen, Le papyrus Revenue Laws, Westdt.Verlag, 1978.
