= Margaret Sibthorp =

English feminist activist, writer, magazine editor and theosophist

Margaret Sibthorp (née Shurmer; c. 1835 – 23 May 1916) was an English feminist activist, writer, magazine editor and theosophist. She founded, then edited the "pioneering women's periodical" Shafts from 1892 until 1899. Sibthorp described it as "the outgoing of my vital breath; the result of the anxious yearning of my inmost spirit; the manifestation of my deep desire to serve the cause of women".

Sibthorp became a member of the Theosophical Society in 1891, which was reflected in Shafts' extensive coverage of occult and psychical topics. In 1909 she became a founding member of the League of Isis, which promoted Frances Swiney's views on the importance of healthy motherhood and the fundamental right of women to regulate sexual intercourse.
