= Shafts =

Defunct feminist magazine

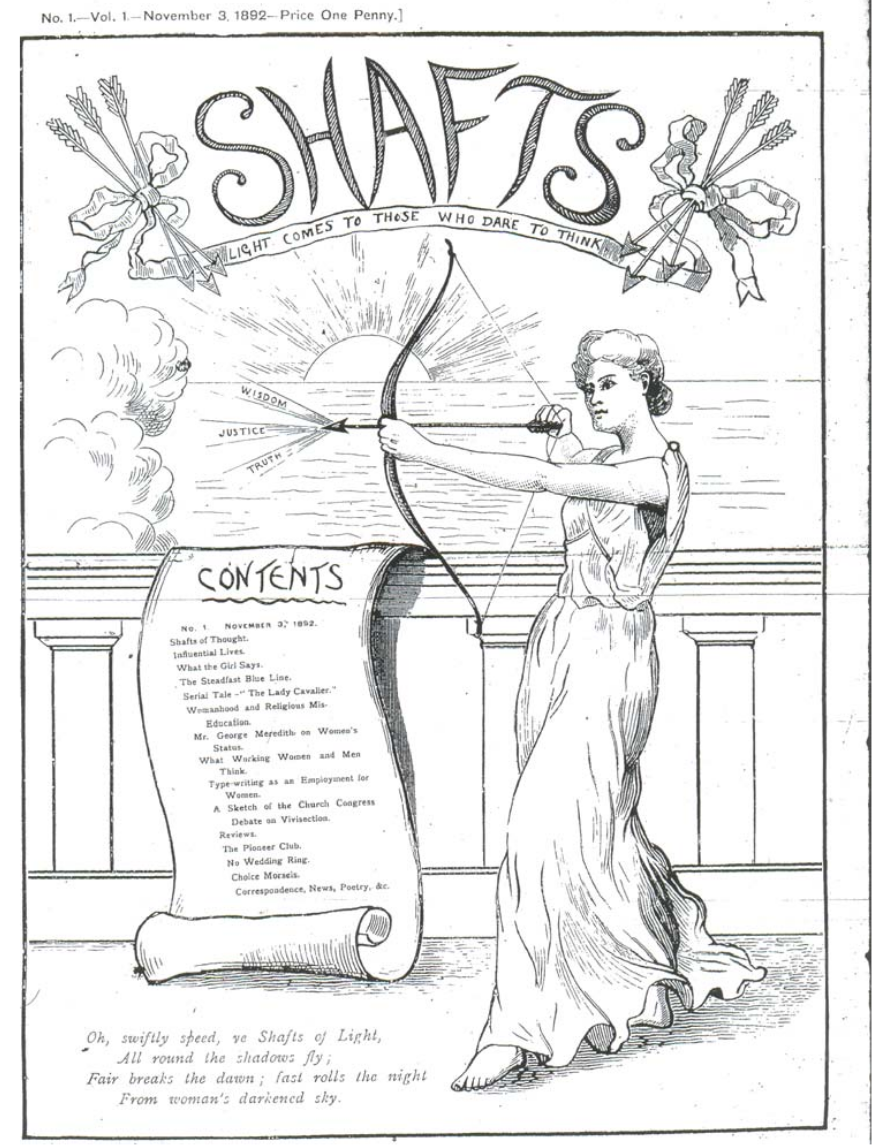
- Cover of Shafts issue 1 (November 1892)
- Editor: Margaret Sibthorp
- Categories: Feminism, Animal Rights
- Frequency: Weekly, monthly, bi-monthly
- Founder: Margaret Sibthorp
- First issue: November 1892
- Final issue: October 1899; 127 years ago
- Country: United Kingdom
- Language: English

Shafts was an English feminist magazine produced by Margaret Sibthorp from 1892 until 1899. Initially published weekly and priced at one penny, its themes included votes for women, women's education, and radical attitudes towards vivisection, dress reform, women's control of their sexuality, child care, and vegetarianism.

== History ==
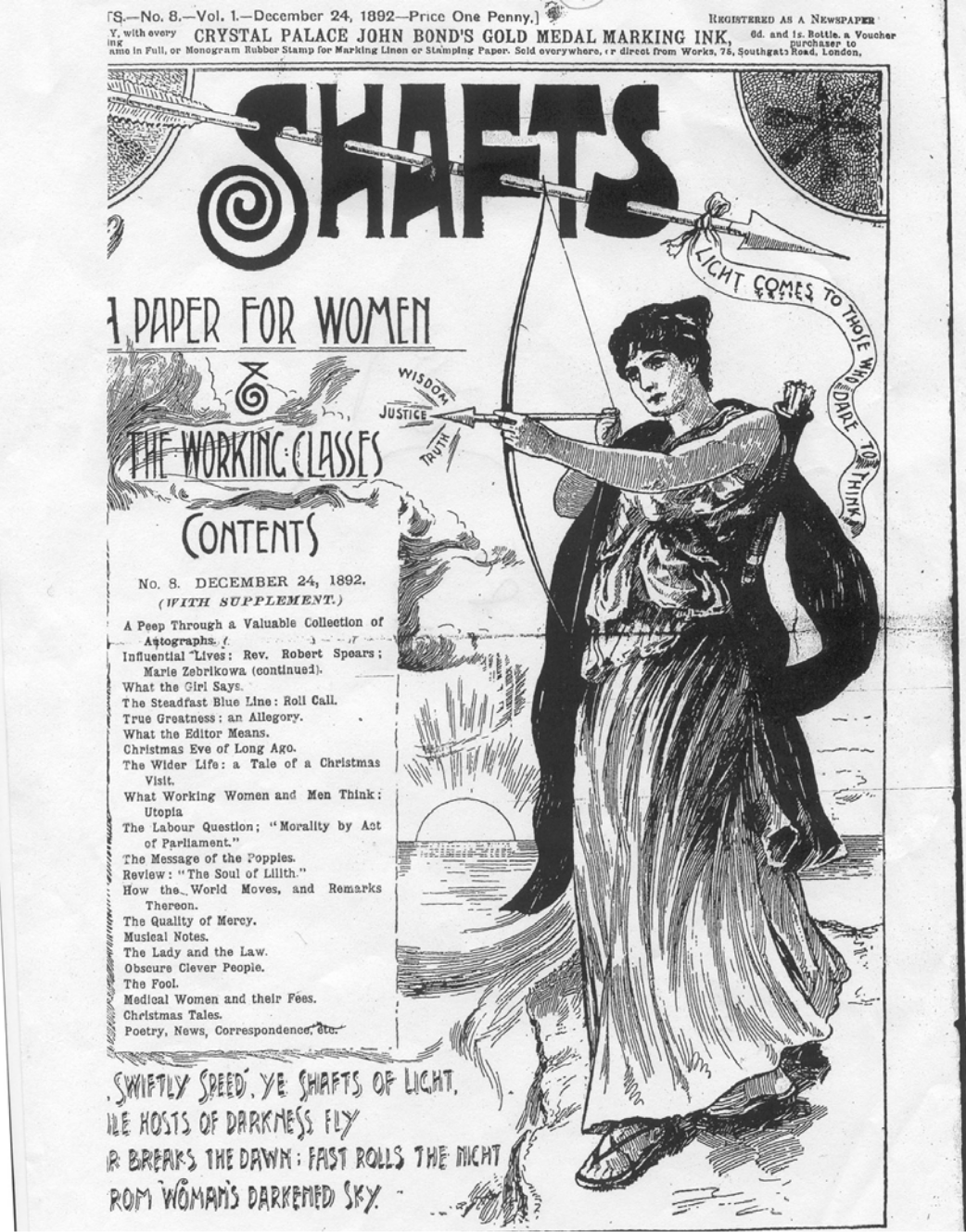
Cover of Shafts issue 8 (December 1892)

The first issue of Shafts was published in November 1892. It was founded and edited by Margaret Sibthorp and was initially funded by an anonymous friend. By June 1893, however, Sibthorp had begun to appeal to readers for financial support. Owing to a lack of funds, Shafts became a monthly publication in 1893, having initially been published weekly. Sibthorp was forced to downsize the magazine's London offices near the Strand—which had once been the location for women's classes, lecture courses and meetings—to a single room, before relocating to her home in suburban West Hampstead in 1895.

In 1898 the frequency of publication was slowed from monthly to bi-monthly, and in 1899, following an announcement that it would henceforth become quarterly, Shafts ceased publication altogether, with the final issue being published in October. The magazine's decline has been attributed to Sibthorp's refusal to follow the emerging "'New Journalism' formula of information, gossip and entertainment", which led to Shafts' loss of readers to competing publications.

Shafts was sold for one penny and was targeted towards lower-middle class women. Most of the magazine's correspondents and contributing writers—with Sibthorp as a notable exception—were published under pseudonyms.

== Content ==
Shafts' themes included votes for women, women's education, and "radical" attitudes towards vivisection, dress reform, women's control of their sexuality, child care, and vegetarianism. In 1897, in the regular section titled "What the Editor Means", Sibthorp described the magazine's mission:

The aim of Shafts is to awaken thought; to induce people to ask why, to question—Is the condition of things I see around me right and just? Is this that I have believed, spiritually, morally, socially, the truth? Am I justified in remaining content with this or that, because my grandparents and parents saw no harm in it, or is it my duty to look into my light, and if I find it but dim, to search humbly and determinedly for a truer and brighter light by which to study my daily tasks?

It published literary criticism, including works about Shakespearean characters, feminist poetry, and book recommendations for young women. Sibthorp was a member of the Theosophical Society, which was reflected in Shafts' extensive coverage of occult and psychical topics. As noted by Claudia Nelson in her book Invisible Men, Shafts "offered little factual reportage" and instead largely consisted of opinion pieces, correspondence columns, short stories, and poetry.

In an August 1893 editorial, Sibthorp stated that Shafts' purpose was to promote knowledge amongst women: "that women must first know all things, ere they can judge of an evil, or any proposed remedy for an evil". Articles and editorials encouraged women to pursue "an education that might emancipate them from patriarchal assumptions". Kate Flint notes in her book The Woman Reader, 1837–1914, that Shafts was one of few feminist periodicals at the time that promoted the furthering of women's rights through education in traditionally male-oriented domains, rather than through protection and control.

The cover of Shafts depicted a woman with a bow shooting an arrow ("shaft") labelled "wisdom", "truth" and "justice".
