= Bernard Pyne Grenfell =

English scientist and Egyptologist (1869–1926)

Bernard Pyne Grenfell FBA
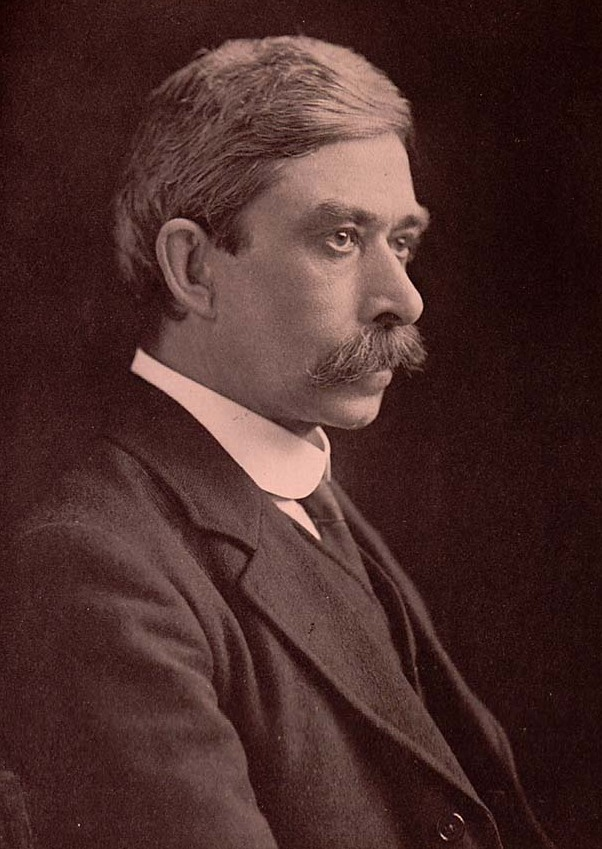
- Born: 16 December 1869; Birmingham, UK
- Died: 18 May 1926 (aged 56); Oxford, UK

Academic background
- Education: The Queen's College, Oxford

Academic work
- Discipline: Egyptology
- Institutions: Oxford University
- Notable works: The Oxyrynchus Papyri

Bernard Pyne Grenfell FBA (16 December 1869 – 18 May 1926) was an English scientist and egyptologist. Excavations he did with Arthur Surridge Hunt uncovered manuscripts including the oldest Oxyrhynchus Papyri.

== Early Life ==
Grenfell was the son of John Granville Grenfell FGS and Alice Grenfell. He was born in Birmingham and brought up and educated at Clifton College in Bristol, where his father taught. He obtained a scholarship in 1888 and enrolled at The Queen's College, Oxford. In 1894, he went to Egypt to be trained by Egyptologist Flinders Petrie at Koptos.

== Egypt ==
After 1895, Grenfell explored the Fayum area of Egypt with his friend and colleague Arthur Surridge Hunt, finding papyri for the Egypt Exploration Fund. The Graeco-Roman Branch of the EEF was founded in 1896, due in large part to Grenfell's work with David Hogarth in 1895. Hunt and Grenfell worked in Karanis, Tebtunis, Oxyrhynchus, el-Hibeh, and Soknopaiou Nesos, all sites in the Fayum, for the next ten years.

At Oxyrhynchus, Grenfell and Hunt discovered ancient manuscripts known as the Oxyrhynchus Papyri, including some of the oldest known copies of the New Testament and the Septuagint. Other notable finds are extensive, including previously unknown works by known classical authors. The majority of the find consists of over half a million documentary texts. Parabiblical material, such as copies of the "Logia (words) of Jesus" were also found. Some fragments of papyri are as small as a postage stamp, others are large rolls. In fact, the ancient dumps of the town of Oxyrhynchus remained intact under the sand until the late nineteenth century, preserving the textual fragments historians need in order to tell the story of ancient Egypt. Archaeologists, historians, and papyrologists are still working to decipher what Grenfell and Hunt found.

His mother, Alice Grenfell, lived with him after his father died in 1897. She took a great interest in Egyptian scarab-shaped artefacts and taught herself to read hieroglyphics. She published her own papers and a catalogue of the scarab collection belonging to The Queen's College.

== Oxford and the Oxyrhynchus Papyri ==
In 1908, he became professor of papyrology at Oxford University and was part of the editing team of The Oxyrynchus Papyri and other similar works. However he was ill for four years and during that time the professorship lapsed. Grenfell was cared for by his mother and he had recovered by 1913. Grenfell and Hunt are hardly discussed apart, as their careers and lives were almost inextricably bound up with one another. They wrote catalogues for collections of papyri at the Amherst, John Rylands, and Cairo collections. The two jointly held a Professorship in Papyrology at Oxford in 1919. In 1920 Grenfell travelled to Egypt for the last time in his life and bought P.Ryl. III 457 (𝔓^{52}), the earliest surviving witness of the Greek New Testament.

He died on 18 May 1926, in Perth and was buried in Holywell Cemetery, Oxford.

== Publications ==
- Grenfell, Bernard Pyne; Hunt, Arthur Surridge (1897). Sayings of Our Lord from an Early Greek Papyrus. Egypt Exploration Fund.
- Grenfell, Bernard Pyne; Hunt, Arthur Surridge; Hogarth, David George (1900). Fayûm Towns and Their Papyri. London.
- Grenfell, Bernard Pyne; Hunt, Arthur Surridge, eds. (1909). Hellenica Oxyrhynchia cum Theopompi et Cratippi Fragmentis. Oxford: Clarendon Press.

== See also ==
- Papyrus Revenue Laws
