= Arthur Surridge Hunt =

English papyrologist (1871–1934)

Arthur Surridge Hunt FBA
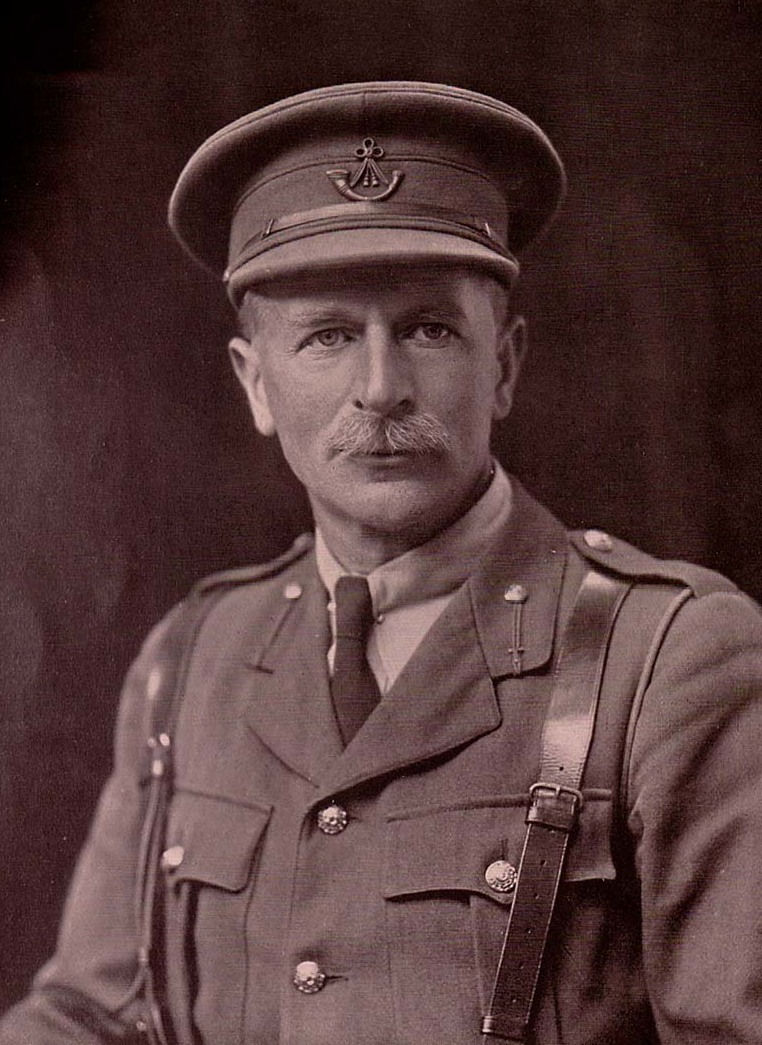
- Born: 1 March 1871; Romford, Essex, England
- Died: 18 June 1934 (aged 63); Oxford, England

Academic work
- Discipline: papyrology
- Institutions: University of Oxford

Arthur Surridge Hunt FBA (1 March 1871 – 18 June 1934) was an English papyrologist.

== Life ==
Hunt was born in Romford, Essex, England. Over the course of many years, Hunt, along with Bernard Grenfell, recovered many papyri from excavation sites in Egypt, including the Oxyrhynchus Papyri.

He worked with Campbell Cowan Edgar on a translation of the Zenon Papyri from the original Greek and Demotic.

In 1913, he became Professor of Papyrology at Oxford, succeeding his lifelong friend and colleague Grenfell, whose professorship lapsed due to the latter’s breakdowns and depression. In the First World War he was commissioned as an officer in 4th Battalion, the Oxfordshire and Buckinghamshire Light Infantry, on 1 May 1915.

In January 1918, he married Lucy Ellen, daughter of Surgeon-Major-General Sir A. F. Bradshaw, but during the next few months their only child died.

== Awards ==
- Appointed Corresponding Fellow of the British Academy.
- 1894 – Elected to the Craven Fellowship.

== Publications ==
- Grenfell, Bernard Pyne and Hunt, Arthur Surridge, Sayings of Our Lord from an early Greek Papyrus (Egypt Exploration Fund; 1897).
- Grenfell, Bernard Pyne, Hunt, Arthur Surridge, and Hogarth, David George, Fayûm Towns and Their Papyri (London 1900).
- Grenfell, Bernard Pyne and Hunt, Arthur Surridge, eds., Hellenica Oxyrhynchia cum Theopompi et Cratippi Fragmentis (Oxford: Clarendon Press, 1909).
- Hunt, Arthur Surridge, "Papyri and Papyrology." The Journal of Egyptian Archaeology 1, no. 2 (1914): 81–92.

== See also ==
- Oxyrhynchus 2011

== Sources ==
- Author and Book Info.com
- Catalogus Philologorum Classicorum
- Catalogus Philologorum Classicorum
- Arthur Surridge Hunt
- Guérud, O. (1939). "Campbell Cowan Edgar (1870-1938)". Annales du Service des Antiquités de l'Égypte, Service des Antiquités de l'Égypte. Cairo: Institut français d'archéologie orientale.
- Milne, J. G. (1934). "Arthur Surridge Hunt". The Journal of Egyptian Archaeology. 20 (3/4): 204–205. doi:10.1177/030751333402000151. JSTOR 3854743.
- Bell, H.; Simpson, R. (23 September 2004). "Hunt, Arthur Surridge (1871–1934), papyrologist.". In Simpson, R. S. (ed.). Oxford Dictionary of National Biography (online ed.). Oxford University Press. doi:10.1093/ref:odnb/34055. ISBN 978-0-19-861412-8. (Subscription, Wikipedia Library access or UK public library membership required.)

== Bibliography ==
- The Oxyrhynchus Papyri, edited with translations and notes by Bernard P. Grenfell and Arthur S. Hunt, Cornell University Library Historical Monographs Collection. {Reprinted by} Cornell University Library Digital Collections
