= Papyrus Oxyrhynchus 74 =

Greek papyrus fragment

Papyrus Oxyrhynchus 74 (P. Oxy. 74) is a registration of property (ἀπογραφή) like P. Oxy. 72 and P. Oxy. 73. It is concerned with the registration of sheep and goats, and is written in Greek. The manuscript was written on papyrus in the form of a sheet. It was discovered by Grenfell and Hunt in 1897 in Oxyrhynchus. The document was written on 28 January 116. Currently it is housed in the library of Hamilton College in Clinton. The text was published by Grenfell and Hunt in 1898.

The letter was addressed to the strategus. It was written by Sarapion, son of Herodes. The letter gives the present number of sheep and goats Sarapion owns compared with the number for the previous year. The measurements of the fragment are 206 by 52 mm.

== See also ==
- Oxyrhynchus Papyri
- Papyrus Oxyrhynchus 73
- Papyrus Oxyrhynchus 75
