= Papyrus Oxyrhynchus 94 =

Greek papyrus fragment on slave agreement

Papyrus Oxyrhynchus 94 (P. Oxy. 94) is an agreement for the sale of two slaves, written in Greek. It was discovered in Oxyrhynchus. The manuscript was written on papyrus in the form of a sheet. The document was written on 26 October 83. Currently, it is housed in the British Library (763) in London.

== Description ==
The document contains an agreement between Marcus Antonius Ptolemaeus and Dionysius, son of Theon. Dionysius undertakes to put up for sale two slaves belonging to Ptolemaeus: Diogas, aged forty years, and another Diogas aged thirty years. The document is written in semi-uncial script. A few alterations were made in a cursive hand. The measurements of the fragment are 365 by 105 mm.

It was discovered by Grenfell and Hunt in 1897 in Oxyrhynchus. The text was published by Grenfell and Hunt in 1898. The fragment was also examined by Frederic G. Kenyon (Bell, Harold Idris, 1907) and Ludwig Mitteis (Chrest. Mitt. 344, 1912).

== See also ==
- Oxyrhynchus Papyri
- Papyrus Oxyrhynchus 93
- Papyrus Oxyrhynchus 95
