= Papyrus Oxyrhynchus 78 =

Greek papyrus fragment

Papyrus Oxyrhynchus 78 (P. Oxy. 78) contains two documents, written in different hands. It is impossible to tell whether they are related to each other. It is written in Greek. The manuscript was written on papyrus in the form of a sheet. It was discovered by Grenfell and Hunt in 1897 in Oxyrhynchus. The document was written about the year 246. Currently it is housed in the library of Hamilton College (Pap. D 2) in Clinton. The text was published by Grenfell and Hunt in 1898.

The first document is an extract from an official tax list. It lists properties owned by Apolinaria; some by her alone and some jointly with others. The second document was written by Aurelius Sarapas and calls attention to the fact that a piece of land was still registered in the official tax lists as belonging to its previous owner, a woman whose name is not given. The second document breaks off before giving a description of the property, and is possibly unfinished. The measurements of the fragment are 233 by 68 mm.

== See also ==
- Oxyrhynchus Papyri
- Papyrus Oxyrhynchus 77
- Papyrus Oxyrhynchus 79
