= Papyrus Oxyrhynchus 90 =

Manuscript in Ancient Greek

Papyrus Oxyrhynchus 90 (P. Oxy. 90) is a receipt for the payment of wheat, written in Greek. The manuscript was written on papyrus in the form of a sheet. It was discovered in the Egyptian city of Oxyrhynchus. The document was written between 179–180. Currently it is housed in the British Library (761) in London. It is known also as P. Lond. 3 p. XXXII no. 761.

== Description ==
The possible cryptogram from P. Oxy. 90

The fragment contains a receipt, and is similar to Papyrus Oxyrhynchus 89. It was written by an unknown author. It states "that Clarus, ex-agoranomus, had deposited 8 artabae 4 choenices in the public granary". According to Grenfell and Hunt, the last two lines are "written in Greek characters, but cannot be construed as Greek. Since they do not appear to be Graecized demotic, they are possibly a cryptogram of some kind." The measurements of the fragment are 103 by 80 mm.

It was discovered by Grenfell and Hunt in 1897 in Oxyrhynchus. The text was published by Grenfell and Hunt in 1898. The fragment was examined by Frederic G. Kenyon (1907), who attempted to decipher it to no avail.

== Text ==
μεμέ(τρηκεν)(*) ἰς̣(*) τὸ δη(μόσιον) (πυροῦ) γενή(ματος) τοῦ διελ(θόντος) ιθ (ἔτους)
Αὐρηλίων Ἀντωνίνου καὶ Κομμόδου
Κ[α]ισάρων τῶν κυρίων (διὰ) σι(τολόγων)(*) λιβὸ(ς) τοπ(αρχίας)
[Σ]ερύ(φεως)(*) τόπ(ων) Κλάρος Διδύμου ἀγορανομή(σας)
[θ]έμ(α) ἀρταβαι(*) ὀκτο(*) χ(οίνικας) δ, (γίνονται) (πυροῦ) (ἀρτάβαι) η \χ(οίνικες) δ./ Διογ(ένης) σι(τολόγος) σεσημ(είωμαι).

== See also ==
- Oxyrhynchus Papyri
- Papyrus Oxyrhynchus 91
