= Papyrus Oxyrhynchus 71 =

Greek papyrus fragment

Papyrus Oxyrhynchus 71 (P. Oxy. 71) contains two petitions with a fragment of a third, addressed to the praefect and written in Greek. The manuscript was written on papyrus in the form of a sheet. It was discovered by Grenfell and Hunt in 1897 in Oxyrhynchus. The document was written on 28 February 303. Currently it is housed in the British Library (755) in London. The text was published by Grenfell and Hunt in 1898.

The letter was addressed to Clodius Culcianus, praefect. The first petition was written by Aurelius Demetrius, son of Nilus (priest at Arsinoe). The second petition was written by Aurelia, a widow. The verso side of the papyrus contains a list of buildings and measurements, written in three columns. The measurements of the fragment are 260 by 548 mm.

== See also ==
- Oxyrhynchus Papyri
- Papyrus Oxyrhynchus 70
- Papyrus Oxyrhynchus 72
