= Papyrus Oxyrhynchus 79 =

Ancient Greek manuscript

Papyrus Oxyrhynchus 79 (P. Oxy. 79) is a declaration of a death, written in Greek. The manuscript was written on papyrus in the form of a sheet. It was discovered by Grenfell and Hunt in 1897 in Oxyrhynchus. The document was written between 181-192. Currently it is housed in the British Library (756) in London. The text was published by Grenfell and Hunt in 1898.

The letter contains a declaration from Cephalus, stating that his son Panechotes has died. It is addressed to the village scribe, Julius. The verso side of the sheet consists of 13 much corrected lines, written in a crude hand, consisting of moral advice and, without much context, describing a death and burial. It is possible that it is a school composition. The measurements of the fragment are 130 by 70 mm.

== See also ==
- Oxyrhynchus Papyri
- Papyrus Oxyrhynchus 78
- Papyrus Oxyrhynchus 80
