= Papyrus Oxyrhynchus 92 =

Greek manuscript

Papyrus Oxyrhynchus 92 (P. Oxy. 92) is an order for payment, written in Greek.The manuscript was written on papyrus in the form of a sheet. It was discovered in Oxyrhynchus. The document was written on 15 October 336. Currently it is housed in the Houghton Library (SM Inv. 2213) of Harvard University in Cambridge.

== Description ==
The document was addressed to Ofellius, with an order to pay ten jars of new wine "for the service of the landowner's house," and one jar to Amethystus (?), a veterinary surgeon. It was written by Aphtonius, son of Sarapion. The measurements of the fragment are 62 by 252 mm.

It was discovered by Grenfell and Hunt in 1897 in Oxyrhynchus. The text was published by Grenfell and Hunt in 1898. The fragment was examined by Karl Wessely (Stud. Pal. 8 1153, 1908).

== Text ==
π(αρὰ) Ἀφθονίου Ὀφελλίῳ Ὦ̣χ̣ι̣ν̣ χαίρειν·
παράσχες εἰς ὑ(*)πηρεσίαν τῆς γεουχ(ικῆς) οἰκίας οἴνου νέου κεράμια δέκα καὶ
Ἀμεσύστῳ ἱ(*)πποι(*)ατρῷ ἐκ διαταγ(ῆς) οἴνου κεράμιον ἓν ν̣έ̣ο̣ν̣ γί(νονται) κ(εράμια) ια
(ἔτους) λα (ἔτους) και ιγ (ἔτους) διῳ ( ), Φαῶφι ιη

== See also ==
- Oxyrhynchus Papyri
- Papyrus Oxyrhynchus 91
- Papyrus Oxyrhynchus 93
