= Papyrus Oxyrhynchus 81 =

Third century Greek manuscript

Papyrus Oxyrhynchus 81 (P. Oxy. 81) is a declaration on oath by a tax collector, written in Greek. The manuscript was written on papyrus in the form of a sheet. It was discovered by Grenfell and Hunt in 1897 in Oxyrhynchus. The document was written between 244-245. Currently it is housed in the British Library (757) in London. The text was published by Grenfell and Hunt in 1898.

The letter is addressed to a strategus of Oxyrhynchus. It was written by a tax collector of Oxyrhynchus, whose name was Aurelius Apion. The measurements of the fragment are 82 by 72 mm.

== See also ==
- Oxyrhynchus Papyri
- Papyrus Oxyrhynchus 80
- Papyrus Oxyrhynchus 82
