= Papyrus Oxyrhynchus 86 =

Ancient Greek manuscript

Papyrus Oxyrhynchus 86 (P. Oxy. 86) is a complaint of a pilot of a public boat, written in Greek. The manuscript was written on papyrus in the form of a sheet. It was discovered in Oxyrhynchus in Egypt. The document was written on 28 March 338, and is now in the Cambridge University Library (MS Add.4040) in Cambridge, England.

== Description ==
The letter contains a petition, addressed to Flavius Eusebius, a logistes (the same as in P. Oxy. 85). It was submitted on behalf of Aurelius Papnouthis by his wife Helena. Papnouthis complains that Eustochius, who was required by a leitourgia to either serve as a sailor on the boat or to pay the salary of a substitute, had failed to do so. The complaint was written out and signed by Aurelius Theon because, as he states regarding Helena, "she is illiterate." The measurements of the fragment are 253 by 100 mm.

It was discovered by Bernard Grenfell and Arthur Surridge Hunt in 1897 in Oxyrhynchus, who published it in 1898.

== See also ==
- Oxyrhynchus Papyri
- Papyrus Oxyrhynchus 85
- Papyrus Oxyrhynchus 87
