= Papyrus Oxyrhynchus 82 =

Third century Greek manuscript

Papyrus Oxyrhynchus 82 (P. Oxy. 82) is a declaration by a strategus, written in Greek. The manuscript was written on papyrus in the form of a sheet. It was discovered by Grenfell and Hunt in 1897 in Oxyrhynchus. The document was written on the middle of the third century. Currently it is housed in the British Library (758) in London. The text was published by Grenfell and Hunt in 1898.

The letter contains a declaration on oath made by a strategus of Oxyrhynchus, made on taking up his office. The name of the author is unknown. In the oath, the strategus affirms that he will distribute the leitourgiai (λειτουργίαι) fairly, carry out his other duties regularly, and provide a surety for his good behavior. The measurements of the fragment are 53 by 65 mm.

== See also ==
- Oxyrhynchus Papyri
- Papyrus Oxyrhynchus 81
- Papyrus Oxyrhynchus 83
