= Papyrus Oxyrhynchus 75 =

Greek papyrus fragment

Papyrus Oxyrhynchus 75 (P. Oxy. 75) is a registration of an inheritance, written in Greek. The manuscript was written on papyrus in the form of a sheet. It was discovered by Grenfell and Hunt in 1897 in Oxyrhynchus. The document was written on 6 April 129. Currently it is housed in the library of the Institute for the Study of Ancient Cultures in Chicago. The text was published by Grenfell and Hunt in 1898.

The letter was addressed to Diogenes and Theon, keepers of the archives. It was written by Theon, son of Theon. The writer registers in this letter the property he inherited under his father's will, which was made in 84. He also notes that his sister Diogenis, bequeathed 1000 drachmae as a dowry, had died without children during her parents' lifetime. The measurements of the fragment are 230 by 830 mm.

== See also ==
- Oxyrhynchus Papyri
- Papyrus Oxyrhynchus 74
- Papyrus Oxyrhynchus 76
