= Bolton Art Gallery, Library & Museum =

Public museum, aquarium and art gallery in Bolton, Greater Manchester, England

Coordinates: 53.5774°N 2.431557°W

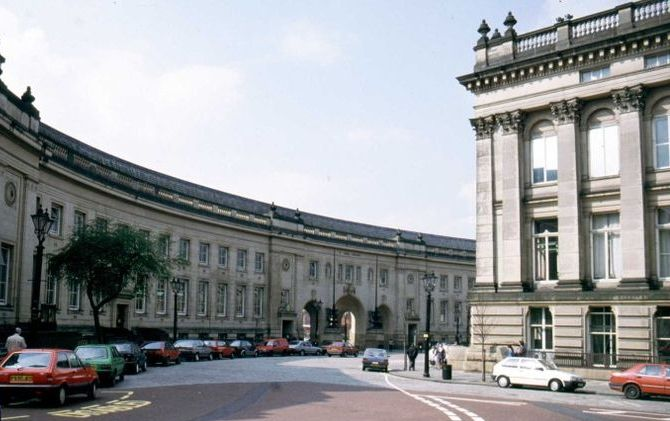
- Bolton Art Gallery, Library & Museum, Le Mans Crescent, Bolton
- Established: 1852; 174 years ago
- Location: Bolton Central Library and Museum, Le Mans Crescent, Bolton, BL1 1SE; United Kingdom
- Visitors: 275,000 (2018)
- Public transit access: Bolton Interchange
- Website: https://www.boltonlams.co.uk/museum

Bolton Art Gallery, Library & Museum is a public museum, art gallery, library and aquarium in the town of Bolton, England, owned by Bolton Metropolitan Borough Council. The museum, Bolton Museum, is housed within the grade II listed Le Mans Crescent near Bolton Town Hall and shares its main entrance with the library, Bolton Central Library, in a purpose-built civic centre.

== Museum history ==
The origins of the current museum date to 1852 when the town adopted the Libraries and Museums Act, leading to the opening of the town's first Library in Victoria Square, now site of the Nationwide Building Society. At that time, the town did not have a public collection to create a museum. The first collection donated was of fossils in the Library's opening year of 1853. The collections of the Museum grew slowly, and by 1876, hosted a good collection of scientific specimens and ethnographic objects. With the collections growing, there was public support for a separate museum, however, the local authority was not willing to use its funds for this purpose.

=== Chadwick ===
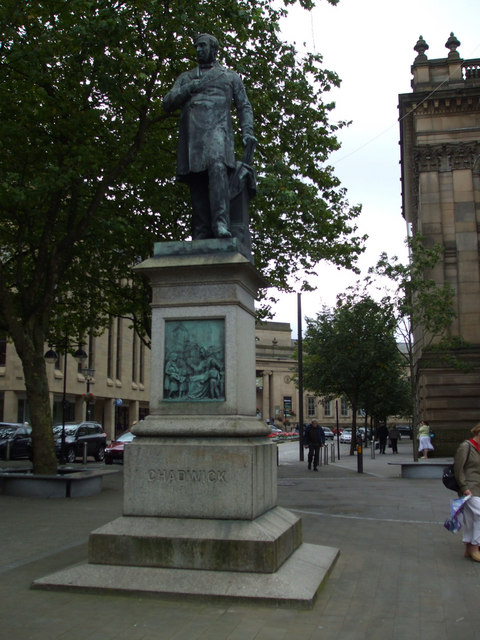
Samuel Taylor Chadwick statue, Victoria Square, Bolton

In 1876, Dr Samuel Taylor Chadwick, a wealthy medical doctor and a benefactor of the town, left a bequest of £5000 to create a museum in Bolton. This also encouraged many others to donate items for the museum. His bequest specified the funds were to be used for the 'building, furnishing and maintenance of a Museum of Natural History in the Bolton Park' with free entry, this early museum was located at Queens Park. The Chadwick Museum was chaired by Councillor B.A. Dobson and its first professional curator William Waller Midgley was employed in 1883. The museum opened in 1884 with three floors with displays.

The Museum added collections of national importance including items of textile machinery, textile samples and Egyptian antiquities with an organised structure, with minerals, rocks and fossils in the basement displays, on the ground floor were zoology displays of stuffed animals, birds' nests and eggs, shells, and insects, the first floor consisted of displays of anthropology, Egyptology and other antiquities and other curiosities. A donation of meteorological instruments in 1885 saw Midgley given the role of 'Observator' and became a Fellow of the Royal Meteorological Society.

The Chadwick Museum was demolished in 1956 and its collections of Egyptian, industrial and local history moved to the Le Mans site, industrial collections were put on display in Tonge Moor library until the 1990s.

=== Branch museums ===
Mere Hall was donated to the town as an art gallery by J.P. Thomasson in 1890, the art comprising mostly 19th-century oil paintings and some older works, including Noah Leaving the Ark by Adam Colonia. From 1897, the local authority began to buy North West contemporary art, often from summer exhibitions held at Mere Hall including artists Fred Balshaw, Alfred Heaton Cooper and Samuel Towers. In 1938, the collections of Mere Hall were transferred to a purpose-built gallery at Le Mans Crescent. Most of its collection was subsequently disposed of before 1948 to make way for new acquisitions. Mere Hall became local authority offices used for weddings until 2016, becoming a music and performance education centre in 2019.

The Grade I listed Hall i' th' Wood was donated as a museum for Samuel Crompton by Lord Leverhulme in 1899, opening in 1902 after restoration. Leverhulme had also proposed a total redesign of Bolton which included an expanded Chadwick Museum at Queen's Park, this plan was rejected but parts of it gave rise to the building of the current Le Mans Crescent in the 1930s. The 'Hall i' th' Wood' museum has continued in its original purpose.

Smithills Hall opened in 1963, a nature trail museum opened in its Park in 1975, and Little Bolton Town Hall operated as a museum from 1979. All branch museums except Hall i' th' Wood and Smithills closed due to budget cuts, a gallery at Le Mans Crescent became the local history and archive section, now managed by the museum. Large collections of over 400,000 museum objects formerly displayed are held in storage off-site; details are contained within the museum's Acquisition and Disposal Policy.

The Chadwick Resource Centre is a museum collections store and research centre housing approximately 60,000 objects that opened in 2012 at Union Road, Bolton, BL2 2HE.

== Le Mans Crescent ==
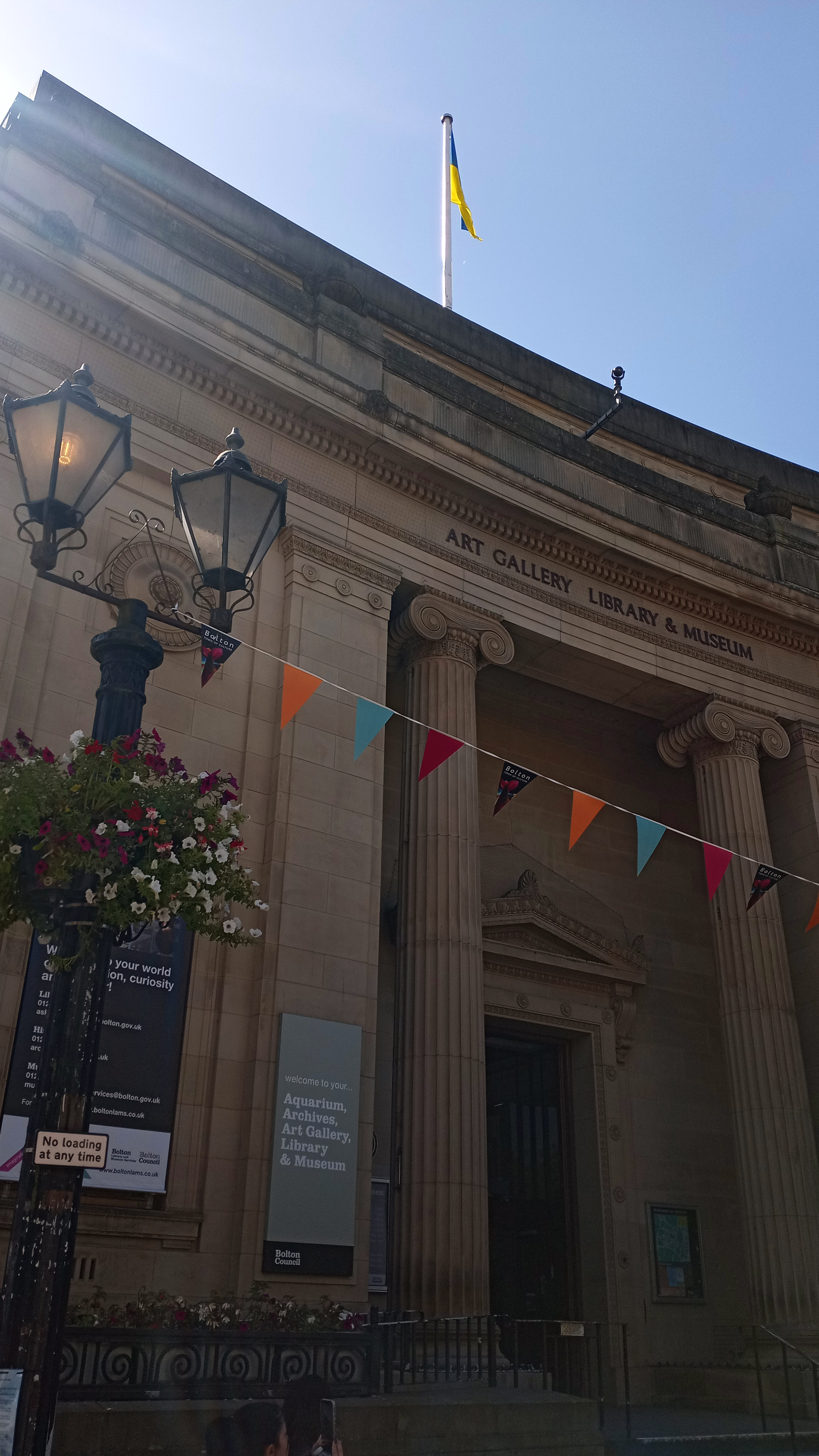
Entrance to the Bolton Art Gallery, Library & Museum

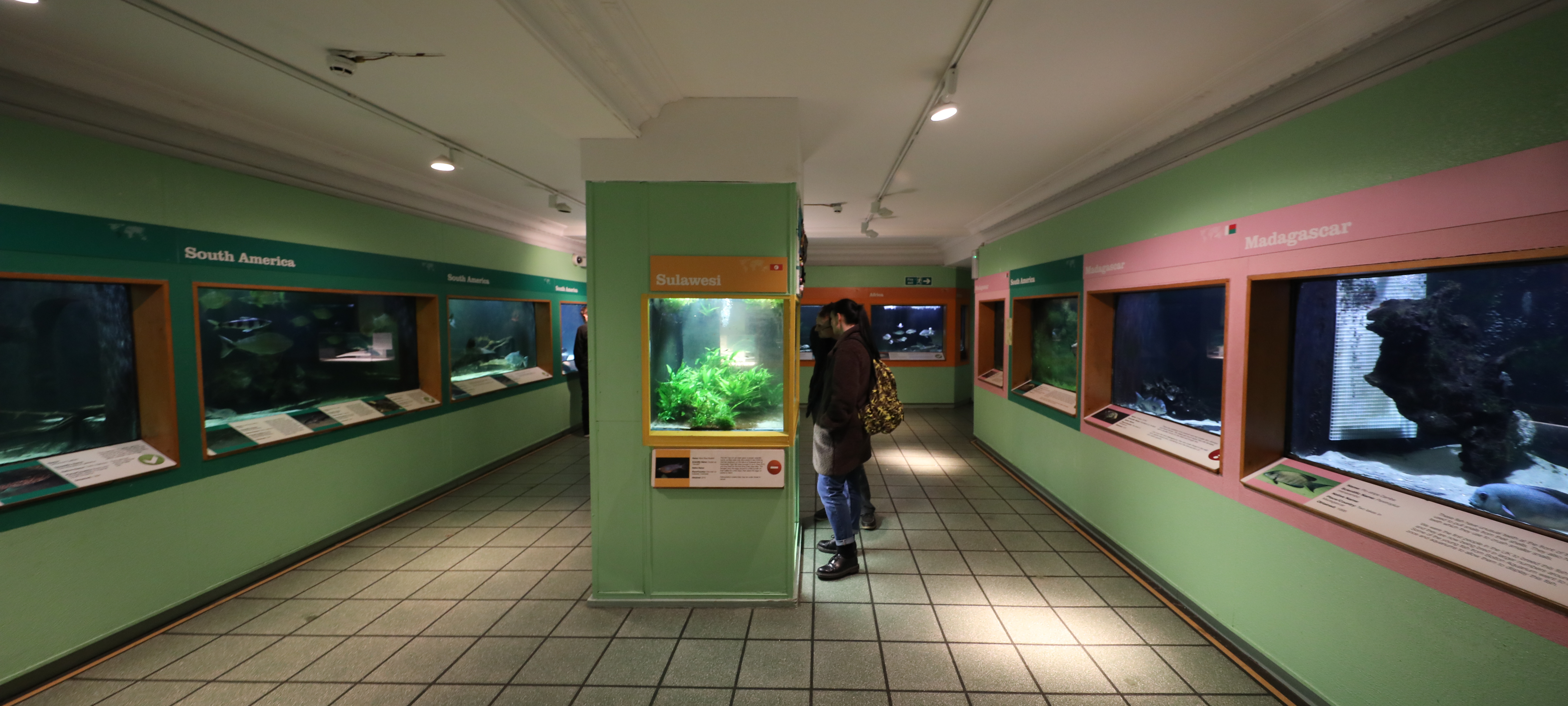
Part of the aquarium

The current Le Mans Crescent Museum was opened by the Mayor in 1934, displaying natural history and art. The aquarium opened in 1941, the full fitting out of the museum was delayed due to World War 2 until 1947. There was some controversy in 2006 as forger Shaun Greenhalgh had sold a statue to the museum collection known as the Amarna Princess. It was subsequently exposed as a forgery. The Museum received £3.8 million in grant funding to update and improve displays in 2018.

=== Collections ===
The collections include natural history, Egyptology, archaeology, art, local history, and one of Britain's oldest public aquariums. These are housed, together with Bolton Central Library, in one end of the Bolton Civic Centre, designed by local architects, Bradshaw Gass & Hope and opened in 1939. The museum has two outlying locations, Smithills Hall and Hall i' th' Wood. The collections include material from many private collectors, including geological specimens from the estate of Caroline Birley. Significant collections within Bolton Museum include the collection of Humphrey Spender material.

==== Egyptology, Archaeology & World Cultures ====
The archaeological collection at Bolton of over 10,000 archaeological objects is one of the largest regional collections in the UK.

===== British Archaeology =====
The British Archaeology collection has approximately 4000 items from British sites since the 1880s and includes the contents of the Silverdale Museum from mid 19th century excavations in locations including Warwickshire and Kent of items from the Neolithic, Bronze Age and Roman material from Derbyshire and elsewhere. The museum also holds the contents of the Castleton Museum and a small number of local finds dating from the Mesolithic to the post-medieval period.

===== Ancient near East =====
The collection from the ancient near East includes finds from excavations in British Palestine by Flinders Petrie between 1926 and 1938 and more recent excavations in Syria, Jordan, Iraq and Iran. A collection from Iraq was donated to the museum by Stand Grammar School, Bury in 1979. Within this collection are approximately 3500 archaeological textiles of Egyptian and Sudanese origin dating from c.5000 BC to the 20th century from excavations in Egypt and Sudan. The museum has a collection of textiles and organic remains from excavations at Badari, Matmar and Mostagedda. There is also a selection of textiles from British excavations at Antinoe, Armant, Tell el Amarna, Fayum, Hawara, Illahun, the collection includes a dozen Roman hats and hairnets, Napata/Sanam Abu Dom, Oxyrhynchus, Qau el-Kebir, Saqqara, Tanis and Tarkhan. There is also material from the Petrie. The museum holds animal mummies, shrouds and bandages. In 2007 a collection of over 3000 objects dating to the Roman/Meroitic through to the Ottoman period was also obtained from the Egypt Exploration Society of textiles from Qasr Ibrim.

===== Worldwide =====
The worldwide collection includes over 1,500 items excavated since the late 19th century. The collection contains artefacts from Swiss lake dwellings at Lake Bienne and Lake Neuchatel, Aztec material from 1881 excavations near Mexico, Stone tools from North America, South America, Europe, Africa, India, the Pacific and Australasia. The Pre-Columbian material is significant and includes four complete mummified human remains.

===== Egyptology =====
The Egyptology objects were excavated from the countries of Egypt and Sudan. The collection includes small domestic items, textiles and fragmentary sculpture. The present Egyptology collection is within a suite of five spaces created in 2018, the collection dates to the Bolton's cotton trade with Alexandria and objects acquired by subscription to excavations in Egypt from 1884 from 68 sites in the Nile Delta and Valley and by recent transfers from the Wellcome Museum, the Petrie Museum and Tamworth Castle Museum. The display commences with a gilded Egyptian mask in a setting created to reflect the original Victorian parlour as the items would have been displayed on first arriving in the UK, alongside a soldiers uniform from the same period and incorporates an electronic presentation of the influence of Ancient Egypt in popular art, culture and design.

==== Botany ====
Botany collection consists of approximately 60,000 specimens consists largely of dried specimens.

==== Vertebrate Zoology ====
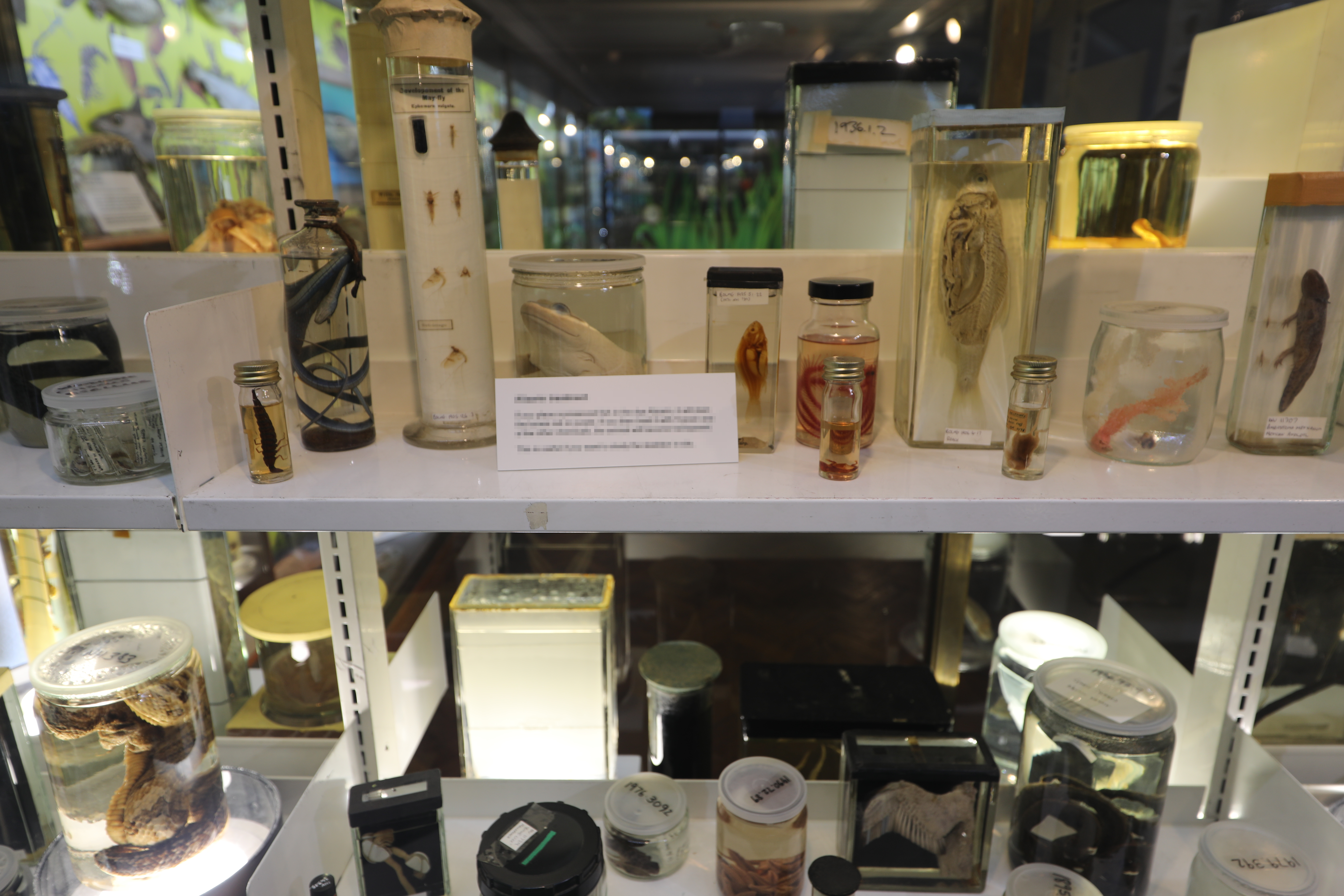
Part of the museum's vertebrate collection

Vertebrate Zoology collection (birds, mammals, amphibians, reptiles & fish) consists of 15,000 to 20,000 specimens.

==== Invertebrate Zoology ====
Invertebrate Zoology collection contains approximately 200,000 specimens.

==== Geology ====
The geology collection consists of around 20,000 specimens.

===== Palaeontology – Fossils =====
The collection consists of approximately 15,000 specimens mainly British and the largest part of the collection is from the Rooke Pennington's Castleton Museum collection.

===== Mineralogy =====
The collection consists of approximately 4,000 specimens.

===== Petrology =====
The museum's petrology collection consists of 2,000 specimens.

===== Slides and Thin Sections =====
The museum's Slides and Thin Sections collection consists of approximately 1,800 slides and thin sections including specimens from the Lomax Palaeobotanical Company.

===== Models =====
The models collection includes those of prehistoric animals made by the Natural History Museum, London, in the 1970s.

==== Fine Art ====
===== Painting, Drawing and Prints =====
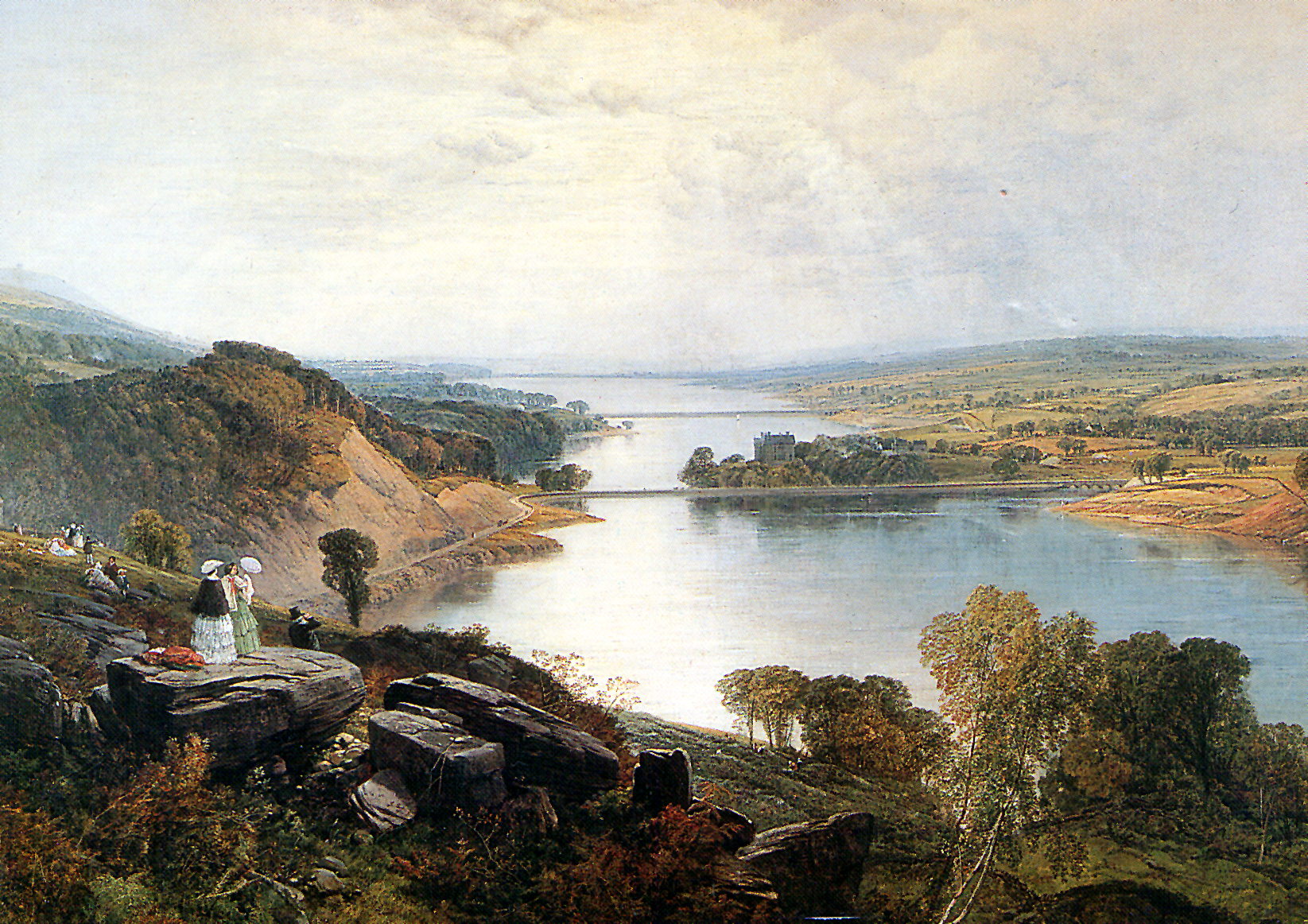
Rivington Lakes, by Frederick William Hulme 1872

Nearing Camp, Evening on the Upper Colorado River, Wyoming by Thomas Moran, 1882

At the start of the Chadwick period, there was little in the way of art in 1853 until the Mere Hall collection was transferred to the Le Mans site at the combined library and museum in 1938, on advice of the Walker Galleries and to make way for new art works the Mere Hall collection was sold. A bequest in 1940 was received from Frank Hindley Smith of Bolton, being part of a collection of British and Continental art distributed to various art galleries including the Tate. Bolton received forty paintings, sculptures and drawings of North West England regional interest by artists Edward Stott as well as British artists of national importance such as Vanessa Bell, Duncan Grant and two works by Roger Fry.

The Walker Galleries had advised Bolton to form its Art collection on four criteria,

1. British oil paintings
2. Portraits of local personalities, local topographical views and examples of the work of significant artists associated with Bolton.
3. English watercolours
4. British sculpture

The policy of acquiring British oil paintings was more recently defined to focus on post war drawings and prints.

The gallery now has paintings of artists including J. M. W. Turner, Luca Giordano, John Bratby, Edward Burra, Elizabeth Blackadder and Laura Knight and a collection of paintings of Thomas Moran.

There are over 1000 prints, mostly of British artists of the 20th century including works from the Sycamore Collection of British printmaking from 1900 to 1960. An iconic painting of local importance held at the Bolton Art Galleries is Rivington Lakes by Frederic William Hulme created in 1872.

===== Sculpture =====
There are 50 items collected in the 1950 and 1960s in the sculpture collection, most of which are mid 20th century British bronzes and include the artists Henry Moore, Barbara Hepworth and Jacob Epstein.

==== Decorative Arts ====
The Decorative Arts collection comprises 900 mostly British ceramic items dating from the medieval period to present; 180 glass objects dating from the 18th century to present; 85 electrotype reproductions acquired from the Victoria & Albert Museum in the 1870s; and 20 decorative carved panels by the Victorian wood grainer and marbler Thomas Kershaw.

A Japan-focused collection was a bequest in 1959 and includes 150 pieces that are mainly 19th century inro, netsuke and scent bottles.

==== Local history ====
There is an extensive local history section with 38,000 objects from the 17th to 20th century relating to Bolton.

The objects included in this section cover the aspects of birth and death; marriage; family and domestic life; work; business and technology; transport; health and medicine; conflict leisure and sport; religion and belief; politics; civic and national life; law, punishment and control; childhood and education; and industry.

=== Special exhibitions ===
==== Bolton Lives ====
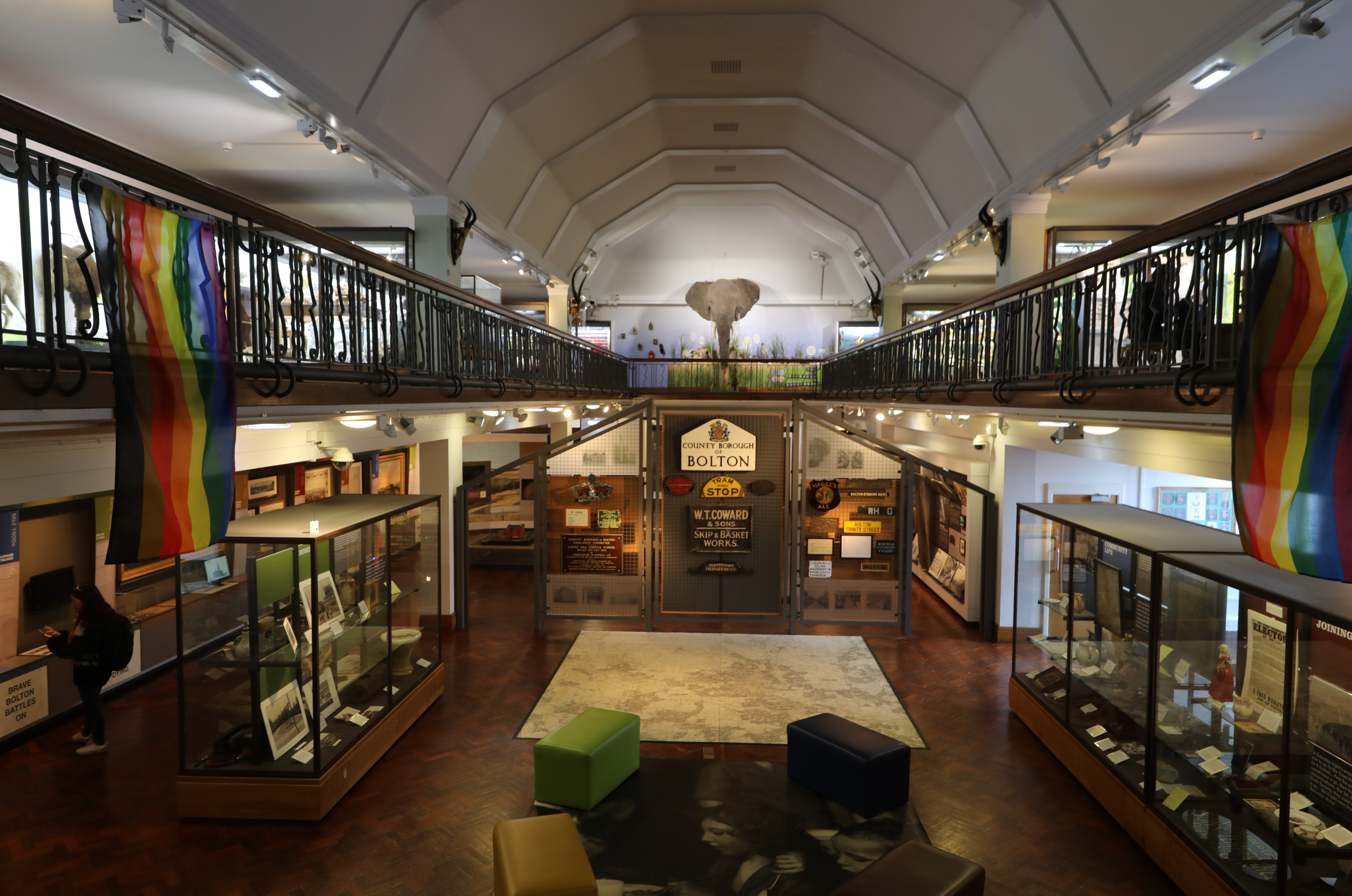
The Bolton Lives gallery

The Bolton Lives gallery presents the story of Bolton and its people.

==== 2019: OUTing the Past and Desire, Love, Identity ====
In March 2019, Bolton Museum hosted the OUTing the Past Festival which featured talks and presentations on LGBT+ history and two performances of "The Adhesion of Love", a dramatization of a visit by a member of the Eagle Street College to Walt Whitman in 1891.

In the summer of 2019, the Bolton Museum hosted the British Museum touring exhibition "Desire Love Identity" exhibition in its renovated temporary exhibition space. The exhibition told the story of LGBT+ history in the UK with this iteration featuring several Bolton specific objects and documents to tell the story of local LGBT+ history in the context of the major national history. The exhibition also featured "Museum Monologues", five in-gallery dramatisations produced by Inkbrew Productions. Talks given included Matt Cain in conversation with James Edgington, discussing his book 'The Madonna of Bolton'. Displays included recalling the progress and creation of 'Bolton Pride' and looked back at the local history of activism, campaigns, events and figures from Bolton's LGBT+ past including displays of photographs and documents of Bolton's first LGB youth group, YGLIB volunteers meeting Anne, Princess Royal. There were also exhibits illustrating the roles of James William Wallace (of the Eagle Street College), Vesta Tilley and Humphrey Spender.

== See also ==
- Bolton Steam Museum
- List of museums in Greater Manchester
- Papyrus Oxyrhynchus 70
