= Papyrus Oxyrhynchus 83 =

Ancient Greek manuscript

Papyrus Oxyrhynchus 83 (P. Oxy. 83) is a declaration by an egg-seller, written in Greek. The manuscript was written on papyrus in the form of a sheet. It was discovered by Grenfell and Hunt in 1897 in Oxyrhynchus. The document was written on 17 January 328. Formerly it was housed in the Rugby School in Rugby. The current location of the fragment is unknown. The text was published by Grenfell and Hunt in 1898.

The letter contains a declaration on oath, made by an egg-seller, addressed to the logistes. The author, Aurelius Nilus, affirms that he will sell eggs only in the public market (ἀγορά). He agrees that he will not sell them secretly or from his house, and that he will be subject to the penalty provided for breaking the oath should he be caught doing so. The measurements of the fragment are 262 by 96 mm.

== See also ==
- Oxyrhynchus Papyri
- Papyrus Oxyrhynchus 82
- Papyrus Oxyrhynchus 84
