= Papyrus Oxyrhynchus 87 =

Egyptian manuscript

Papyrus Oxyrhynchus 87 (P. Oxy. 87) is a declaration on oath by a ship owner, written in Greek. The manuscript was written on papyrus in the form of a sheet. It was discovered in Oxyrhynchus. The document was written between 25 February and 26 March 342. Currently it is housed in the Sackler Library (Papyrology Rooms, P. Oxy. 87 col. 3) in Oxford.

== Description ==
The letter contains a declaration on oath, addressed to Flavius Dionysarius, a logistes. It was written by Aurelius Serapion, a ship owner. He affirms his readiness to go to "the most illustrious city of Alexandria" to testify at an official inquiry to be held there. The measurements of the fragment are 252 by 225 mm. The document has survived in a very fragmentary condition. Originally it contained a series of declarations on oath, but only one has survived.

It was discovered by Grenfell and Hunt in 1897 in Oxyrhynchus. The text was published by Grenfell and Hunt in 1898.

== See also ==
- Oxyrhynchus Papyri
- Papyrus Oxyrhynchus 86
- Papyrus Oxyrhynchus 88
