= Eagle Street College =

British informal literary society

The Eagle Street College was an informal literary society established in 1885 at the home of James William Wallace in Eagle Street, Bolton, to read and discuss literary works, particularly the poetry of Walt Whitman (1819–1891). The group subsequently became known as the Bolton Whitman Fellowship or the "Whitmanites". Its founder members were Dr. John Johnston, Fred Wild, and Wallace. The group held an annual 'Whitman Day' celebration around the May 31st, the poet's birthday.

Wallace and Johnston corresponded with Whitman, and Johnston visited Whitman at his home in Camden, New Jersey. Wallace visited Whitman in 1891. This visit was the subject of a play by Stephen M Hornby called "The Adhesion of Love" which toured the North West in 2019, including to Bolton Museum and the Bolton Socialist Club, whose members run the annual 'Whitman Day'. It was the national LGBT History Month heritage premiere for 2019. The play speculates that the men in the group were experimenting with different forms of emotional and sexual intimacy with each other and that this was a significant factor in the success of the group and its interest in Walt Whitman.

Wallace moved to Adlington in the early 1890s and invited Charles Sixsmith to join the group which continued until the death of Wallace in 1926, and in a more modest form after that. After Wallace moved to Adlington in the early 1890s, the group continued to meet in each other's homes. Sixsmith was involved in the annual Whitman celebrations until the late 1930s. A plaque marking one of these celebrations can be found in the grounds of Rivington Unitarian Chapel.
