= Papyrus Oxyrhynchus 95 =

Greek manuscript written in 129 AD

Papyrus Oxyrhynchus 95 (P. Oxy. 95) is an agreement for the sale of a slave, written in Greek. It was discovered in Oxyrhynchus. The manuscript was written on papyrus in the form of a sheet. The document was written on 23 June 129. Currently it is housed in the library of the Royal Holloway College (P. Oxy. 95) in Egham.

== Description ==
The document was written by Agathosdaemon and addressed to Gaius Julius Germanus. It is a contract for the purchase a female slave for 1200 drachmae of silver. The measurements of the fragment are 182 by 125 mm.

The agreement reads, in part:

The 13th year of the Emperor Caesar Trajanus Hadrianus Augustus, Payni 29, at Oxyrhynchus in the Thebaid. Agathodaemon also called Dionysius, son of Dionysius, son of Dionysius, his mother being Hermione, of Oxyrhynchus, agrees with Gaius Julius Germanus, son of Gaius Julius Domitianus (the agreement being executed in the street) that he hereby assents to the autograph contract, made on Tybi 25 of the present 13th year, for the sale to Julius Germanus of a slave named Dioscorous, about 25 years old, with no distinguishing marks, which slave was his by purchase, having previously belonged to Heraclides also called Theon, son of Machon, son of Sosicosmius, also called Althaeeus. This slave Julius Germanus then took from him just as she was, free from blemish except epilepsy and marks of punishment (?)"

It was discovered by Grenfell and Hunt in 1897 in Oxyrhynchus. The text was published by Grenfell and Hunt in 1898. The fragment was also examined by Ludwig Mitteis (1912) and Campbell Cowan Edgar (1932). It was published several times.

== See also ==
- Oxyrhynchus Papyri
- Papyrus Oxyrhynchus 94
- Papyrus Oxyrhynchus 96
