= Papyrus Oxyrhynchus 88 =

Egyptian manuscript

Papyrus Oxyrhynchus 88 (P. Oxy. 88) is an order for payment of wheat, written in Greek. The manuscript was written on papyrus in the form of a sheet. It was discovered in Oxyrhynchus. The document was written on 31 October 179. Currently it is housed in the University Museum of the University of Pennsylvania (E 2752) in Philadelphia.

== Description ==
The letter contains a petition, addressed to the overseers of the granaries (σιτολογοι) of the village of Petne. It was written by Lampon, son of Ammonius, in his role as manager of the house of the gymnasiarchs. The letter contains an order for payment of 60 artabae of wheat to Sarapion, son of Heliodorus. The measurements of the fragment are 135 by 112 mm.

The fragment was discovered by Grenfell and Hunt in 1897 in Oxyrhynchus. The text was published by Grenfell and Hunt in 1898.

== See also ==
- Oxyrhynchus Papyri
- Papyrus Oxyrhynchus 87
- Papyrus Oxyrhynchus 89
