= Papyrus Oxyrhynchus 93 =

Ancient Greek manuscript

Papyrus Oxyrhynchus 93 (P. Oxy. 93) is an order for payment, written in Greek. The manuscript was written on papyrus in the form of a sheet. It was discovered in Oxyrhynchus. The document was written on 16 January 362. Currently it is housed in the British Library (762) in London.

== Description ==
The letter was written by Eutrygius addressed to Dioscorus, his assistant. It is an order to pay two artabae of wheat to Gorgonius the "hydraulic-organ player" (ὑ(*)δραύλῃ). The measurements of the fragment are 58 by 158 mm.

It was discovered by Grenfell and Hunt in 1897 in Oxyrhynchus. The text was published by Grenfell and Hunt in 1898. The fragment was examined by Karl Wessely (Stud. Pal. 8 1154, 1908).

== Text ==
π(αρὰ) Εὐτρυγίου Διοσκόρῳ βοηθῷ χαί(ρειν)·
δὸς Γοργονίῳ ὑ(*)δραύλῃ ἐκ διαταγῆς σίτου
(ἀρτάβας) δύο
(ἔτους) λη (ἔτους) // ζ (ἔτους) // Τῦβι // κα ( ), κα, σεσημείωμαι·

== See also ==
- Oxyrhynchus Papyri
- Papyrus Oxyrhynchus 92
- Papyrus Oxyrhynchus 94
