= Papyrus Oxyrhynchus 76 =

Ancient Greek manuscript

Papyrus Oxyrhynchus 76 (P. Oxy. 76) is a letter to the strategus, written in Greek. The manuscript was written on papyrus in the form of a sheet. It was discovered by Grenfell and Hunt in 1897 in Oxyrhynchus. The document was written on 3 June 179. Currently it is housed in the Cambridge University Library (MS Add.4039) in Cambridge. The text was published by Grenfell and Hunt in 1898.

The letter is addressed to a strategus named Theon. It was written by Apia, the daughter of Horion. She advises Theon that Horion is dangerously ill. She goes on to say that she is informing Theon that she has no desire to inherit her father's property and asking for his instructions "about the next step to be taken, in order to free me from responsibility after his death." The measurements of the fragment are 306 by 78 mm.

== See also ==
- Oxyrhynchus Papyri
- Papyrus Oxyrhynchus 75
- Papyrus Oxyrhynchus 77
