= Nearing Camp, Evening on the Upper Colorado River, Wyoming =

Painting by Thomas Moran

- Artist: Thomas Moran
- Year: 1882
- Type: Oil on canvas, landscape painting
- Dimensions: 66 cm × 160 cm (26 in × 63 in)
- Location: Bolton Museum, Greater Manchester

Nearing Camp, Evening on the Upper Colorado River, Wyoming is an 1882 landscape painting by the British-American artist Thomas Moran. It depicts a romanticised view of a landscape looking towards the Green River in Wyoming.

Moran had left his native England as a child in 1844 and became associated with the Hudson River School. This painting was part of the Fine Art Exhibition in Whitechapel in 1882. In 1998 the painting was acquired for £1.34 million following a fundraising campaign, including a grant from the National Lottery, for the collection of Bolton Museum in his hometown.

== Bibliography ==
- Cowie Peter. John Ford and the American West. Harry N. Abrams, 2004.
- Morris, Edward. Public Art Collections in North-west England: A History and Guide. Liverpool University Press, 2001.
