= Papyrus Oxyrhynchus 91 =

Manuscript in Ancient Greek

Papyrus Oxyrhynchus 91 (P. Oxy. 91) is a receipt for wages for wet nursing, written in Greek. The manuscript was written on papyrus in the form of a sheet. It was discovered in Oxyrhynchus. The document was written on 13 October 187. Currently it is housed in the library of the Royal Holloway College in Egham.

== Description ==
The document was addressed to Tanenteris, daughter of Thonis. It was written by Chosion, son of Sarapion. It is a receipt of 400 drachmae, paid through the bank at the Serapeum. The measurements of the fragment are 205 by 87 mm.

It was discovered by Grenfell and Hunt in 1897 in Oxyrhynchus. The text was published by Grenfell and Hunt in 1898. The fragment was examined by Campbell Cowan Edgar (1932), M. M. Masciadri (1984), and Jane Rowlandson (1998).

== Text ==
Grenfell and Hunt's translation of this document runs as follows:

Chosion, son of Sarapion, son of Harpocration, his mother being Sarapias, of Oxyrhynchus, to Tanenteris, daughter of Thonis, son of Thonis, her mother being Zoilous, of the same city, with her guardian Demetrius, son of Horion and Arsinoe, of the same city, greeting. I acknowledge the receipt from you through Heliodorus and his associate overseers of the bank at the Serapeum near the city of Oxyrhynchus, for which Epimachus made the promise of payment, of four hundred drachmae in imperial coin for wages, oil, clothes and all other expenses during the two years in which my slave Sarapias nursed your daughter Helena, known as her father's child; who when you took her back had been weaned and had received every attention; and I acknowledge that I neither have nor shall have any complaint or charge to make against you either in connexion with this transaction or any other matter whatever up to the present time. This receipt is valid.

== See also ==
- Oxyrhynchus Papyri
- Papyrus Oxyrhynchus 90
- Papyrus Oxyrhynchus 92
