= Papyrus Oxyrhynchus 84 =

316 CE record of a payment to the guild of ironworkers

Papyrus Oxyrhynchus 84 (P. Oxy. 84) records a payment to the guild of ironworkers, and is written in Greek. The manuscript was written on papyrus in the form of a sheet. It was discovered by Grenfell and Hunt in 1897 in Oxyrhynchus. The document was written on 1 November 316. Currently it is housed in the British Library (759) in London. The text was published by Grenfell and Hunt in 1898.

The letter contains a receipt, addressed to Valerius Ammonianus, a logistes. It was written by Aurelius Severus, who was the monthly president of the guild. The letter acknowledges the receipt of 6 talents of silver, which was the price of a centenarium of wrought iron. The iron had been used in public works, so the payment was made from the official bank of the state revenues at Oxyrhynchus. The measurements of the fragment are 254 by 126 mm.

== See also ==
- Oxyrhynchus Papyri
- Papyrus Oxyrhynchus 83
- Papyrus Oxyrhynchus 85
