= Papyrus Oxyrhynchus 73 =

Greek papyrus fragment

Papyrus Oxyrhynchus 73 (P. Oxy. 73), is a notice of a transfer of property (ἀπογραφή), like P. Oxy. 72. However in this case the property being transferred is a slave. The document is written in Greek. The manuscript was written on papyrus in the form of a sheet. It was discovered by Grenfell and Hunt in 1897 in Oxyrhynchus. The document was written between 25 July and 28 August 94. Currently it is housed in the John Rylands University Library in Manchester. The text was published by Grenfell and Hunt in 1898.

The letter was addressed to an official. It mentions that it was drawn up "in the street," which probably means before a public notary. This is a form used in contracts agreed to in the presence of the agoranomus. It was written by Thamounion, daughter of Adrastus, with her husband Dionysius acting as kurios (κύριος). The measurements of the fragment are 227 by 71 mm.

== See also ==
- Oxyrhynchus Papyri
- Papyrus Oxyrhynchus 72
- Papyrus Oxyrhynchus 74
