= Papyrus Oxyrhynchus 70 =

Greek papyrus fragment

Papyrus Oxyrhynchus 70 (P. Oxy. 70) is a petition, written in Greek. The manuscript was written on papyrus in the form of a sheet. It was discovered by Grenfell and Hunt in 1897 in Oxyrhynchus. The document was written between 212 and 213. Currently it is housed in the Bolton Art Gallery and Museum in Bolton. The text was published by Grenfell and Hunt in 1898.

The letter was addressed to Aurelius Herapion, epistrategus, and concerns a debt owed to the author by Agathodaemon. It was written by Ptolemaeus, former agoranomus. The measurements of the fragment are 184 by 148 mm.

== See also ==
- Oxyrhynchus Papyri
- Papyrus Oxyrhynchus 69
- Papyrus Oxyrhynchus 71
