= Papyrus Oxyrhynchus 80 =

Third century CE police report

Papyrus Oxyrhynchus 80 (P. Oxy. 80) is a police report, written in Greek. The manuscript was written between A.D. 238 and 234 on a sheet of papyrus, 168 by 70 mm. It was discovered at the site of ancient Oxyrhynchus by Grenfell and Hunt in 1897, and published the following year. The manuscript is housed in the library of Winchester College.

The report is addressed to the chiefs of the police at Oxyrhynchus. Probably it was written by a local inspector (ἀρχέφοδος), whose name is unknown.

== See also ==
- Oxyrhynchus Papyri
- Papyrus Oxyrhynchus 79
- Papyrus Oxyrhynchus 81
