= Samuel Taylor Chadwick =

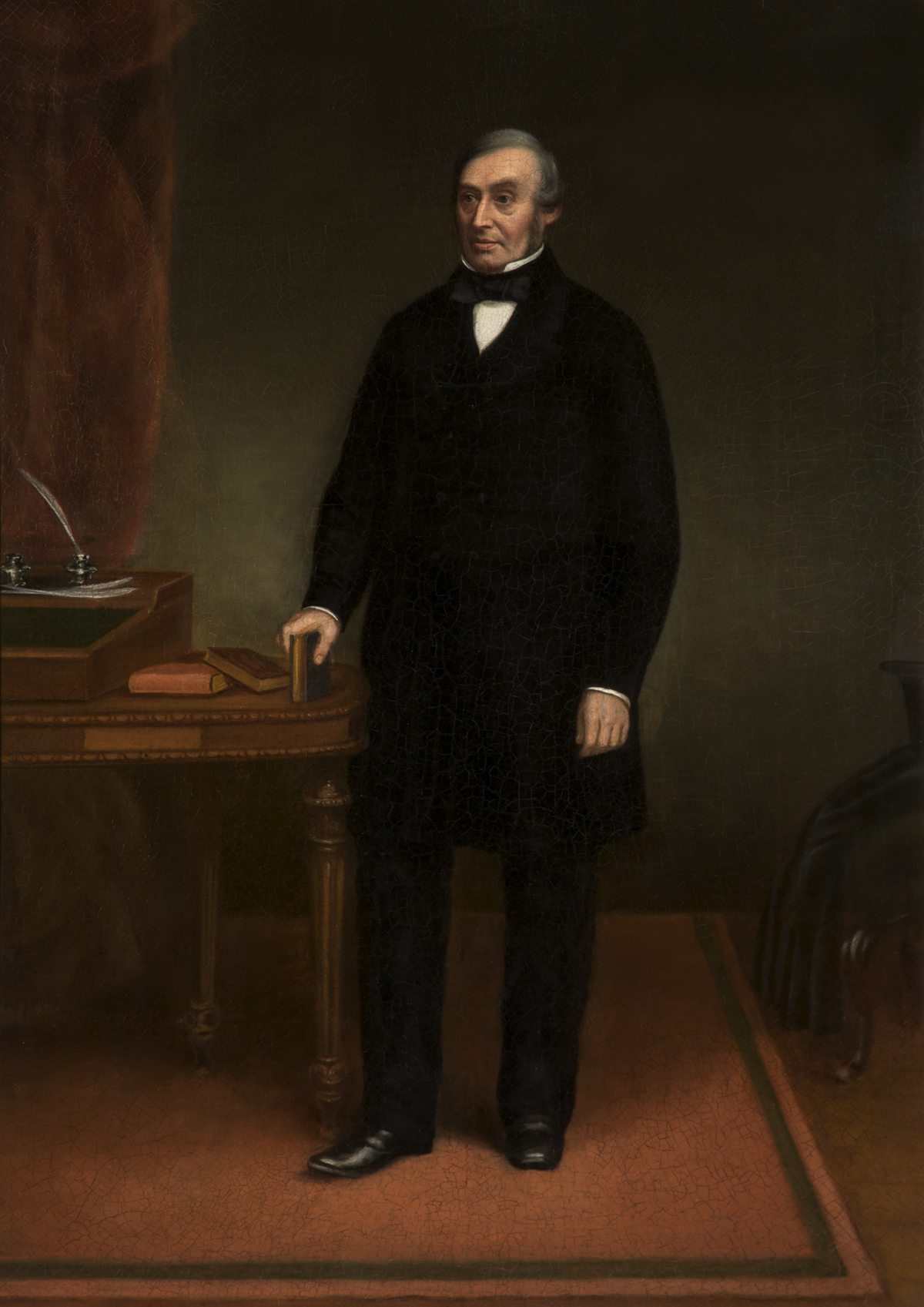
Samuel Taylor Chadwick

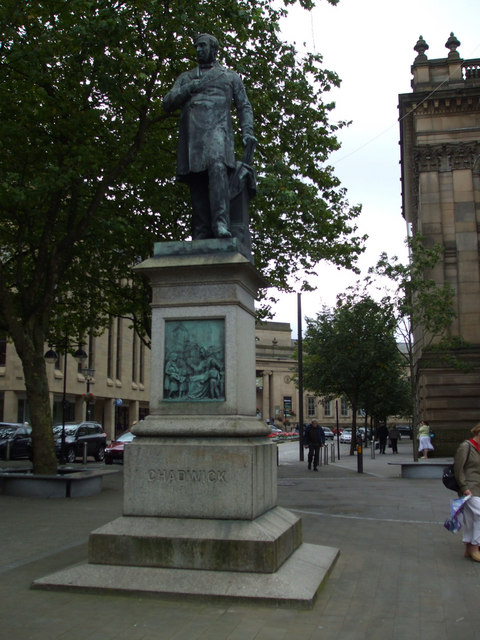
Samuel Taylor Chadwick statue, Victoria Square, Bolton

Samuel Taylor Chadwick (1809 – 3 May 1876) was an English medical doctor and philanthropist.

== Life ==
Chadwick was born in Newcroft House in Urmston, Lancashire, and educated at Stretford School before moving to Bolton at the age of 14 to live with a doctor uncle in Sweet Green. Chadwick himself then decided to study medicine at the University of London in 1828, becoming a Member of the Royal College of Surgeons (MRCS).

He returned to Lancashire and set up a practice in Wigan, moving to Bolton in 1837 to succeed his uncle. To improve his medical knowledge and skills he went to Ireland for two years, qualifying as a Licentiate of the Royal College of Surgeons (LRCS), and Scotland for one year, qualifying LRCS of Edinburgh. After further study he was awarded the degree of MD in Edinburgh.

He again returned to Bolton and established an eye clinic and an ear, nose and throat clinic and became honorary surgeon at Bolton Hospital. He donated £5000 towards the building of the Chadwick ear, nose and throat ward. His surgical skill resulted in his election as a Fellow of the Royal College of Surgeons.

He provided the funds to set up a Mechanics Institute and gave lectures on public health issues. Further donations enabled houses to be built for people living in cellars. He was elected to Bolton Council and fought for better public health provisions such as cleaner water, established the Chadwick Orphanage which could house 80 girls and improved the Bolton Workhouse. He donated money to establish a natural history museum in the town's Queen's Park, which was the basis of the present Bolton Museum now relocated to the town centre. His final act of philanthropy before his retirement to Southport in 1863 was to set up a charity to help European refugees.

He died on 3 May 1876 and was buried at Bolton Parish Church. He had married Ann Hall, a wine merchant's daughter, but both their children died young. In 1873 Bolton council erected the statue of him which stands today outside Bolton Town Hall.
