= Papyrus Oxyrhynchus 85 =

Fourth century Greek manuscript

Papyrus Oxyrhynchus 85 (P. Oxy. 85) is part of a series of declarations by various guilds of workmen, written in Greek. The manuscript was written on papyrus in the form of a sheet. It was discovered in Oxyrhynchus. The document was written on 26 November 338. Currently it is housed in the Department of Manuscripts of the British Library (760) in London.

== Description ==
The letter contains a series of declarations (six of them preserved), addressed to Flavius Eusebius, a logistes of the Oxyrhynchite nome (the same one as in P. Oxy. 86). The guilds state the value of their goods left in stock at the end of a month. Guilds represented are coppersmiths, beer sellers, bakers, oil sellers, and bee-keepers. The declaration from the coppersmiths was written by Aurelius Thonis. The measurements of the fragment are 238 by 220 mm.

Papyri P.Oxy. LIV 3772 and SB XVI 12648 are similar to this one.

It was discovered by Grenfell and Hunt in 1897 in Oxyrhynchus. The text was published by Grenfell and Hunt in 1898. It was also examined by Joachim Hengstl (1985).

== See also ==
- Oxyrhynchus Papyri
- Papyrus Oxyrhynchus 84
- Papyrus Oxyrhynchus 86
