= Papyrus Oxyrhynchus 96 =

2nd Century historical artifact

Papyrus Oxyrhynchus 96 (P. Oxy. 96 or P. Oxy. I. 96) is an order concerning payment of sales tax, written in Greek. It was discovered in Oxyrhynchus in Egypt. The manuscript was written on papyrus in the form of a sheet. The document was written on 5 November 180. Currently it is housed in the Cambridge University Library (MS Add.4041) in Cambridge.

== Description ==
The document was written by Diogenes, the contractor for the sales tax that year, and addressed to the public bank of Oxyrhynchus. It authorizes the bank to receive 52 drachmae as tax on the purchase of a slave, which was probably 10% of the purchase price. The slave, named Plution, was purchased by a woman named Chaeremonis. The measurements of the fragment are 255 by 80 mm.

It was discovered by Grenfell and Hunt in 1897 in Oxyrhynchus. The text was published by Grenfell and Hunt in 1898. The fragment was also examined by Eck and Heinrichs (Eck & Heinrichs, Sklaven und Freigelassene (1993), p. 40, Nr. 53).

== See also ==
- Oxyrhynchus Papyri
- Papyrus Oxyrhynchus 95
- Papyrus Oxyrhynchus 97
