= Papyrus Oxyrhynchus 77 =

Letter to Aurelius Ammonius, written in Greek

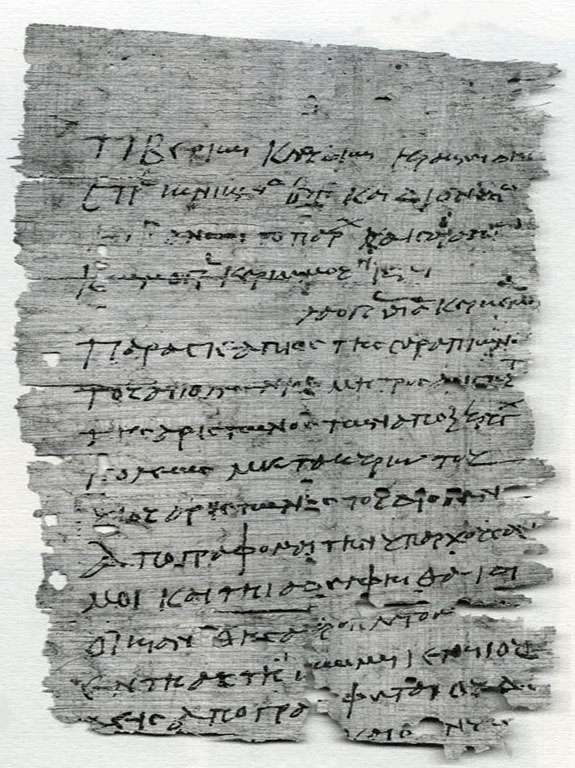
P. Oxy. 77

Papyrus Oxyrhynchus 77 (P. Oxy. 77) is a letter to Aurelius Ammonius, prytanis and gymnasiarch, written in Greek. The manuscript was written on papyrus in the form of a sheet. It was discovered by Grenfell and Hunt in 1897 in Oxyrhynchus. The document was written on 19 May 223. Currently it is housed in the library of the Trinity College (Pap. D 2) in Dublin. The text was published by Grenfell and Hunt in 1898.

The letter was written by Julia Dionysia in response to Aurelius's inquiry as to whether Julia or her husband, Aurelius Sarapiacus, owned a particular house. In the letter, Julia makes a declaration on her oath that "by the fortune of Marcus Aurelius Severus Alexander the lord Caesar that the house in question and all its contents belong to me, Julia Dionysia." The measurements of the fragment are 222 by 76 mm.

== See also ==
- Oxyrhynchus Papyri
- Papyrus Oxyrhynchus 76
- Papyrus Oxyrhynchus 78
