= Papyrus Oxyrhynchus 89 =

Greek papyrus fragment

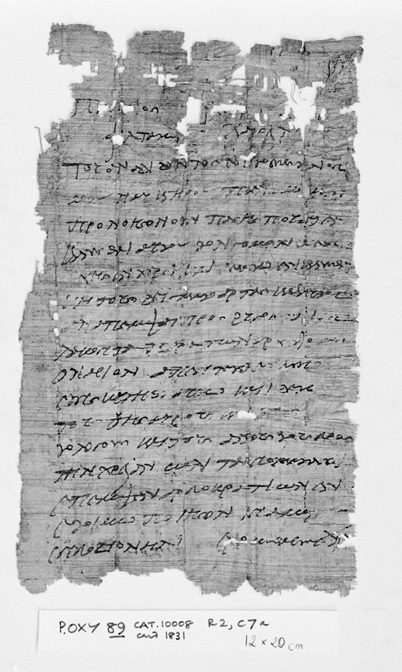
P. Oxy. 89

Papyrus Oxyrhynchus 89 (P. Oxy. 89) is a receipt for the payment of wheat, written in Greek. The manuscript was written on papyrus in the form of a sheet. It was discovered in Oxyrhynchus. The document was written on 29 July 140. Currently it is housed in the Egyptian Museum (Cat. Gen. 10008) in Cairo.

== Description ==
The fragment was written by an unknown author. According to Grenfell and Hunt it is a "receipt showing that Horion, son of Sarapion, had paid into the public granary 115 1/4 artabae of wheat from the harvest of the third year of Antoninus". The measurements of the fragment are 200 by 120 mm.

The fragment was discovered by Grenfell and Hunt in 1897 in Oxyrhynchus. The text was published by Grenfell and Hunt in 1898.

== Text ==
μεμέ(τρηκεν)(*) εἰς τὸ δημόσιο(ν) (πυροῦ) γενήμ(ατος)
γ (ἔτους) Ἀντωνίνου Καίσαρος τοῦ
κυρίου μέτρῳ δημοσίῳ με-
τρήσει τῇ κελευσθείσῃ (διὰ) σι(τολόγων)(*)
Μ̣ο̣νί̣μ̣ου(*) τόπων ἐπὶ τῆς ε
τοῦ Μεσορὴ Ὡρίων Σαραπίων-
ος ἀρτάβ(ας) ἑκατὸν δέκα πέντε
τέταρτον . Θεόξενο(ς) σεση(μείωμαι) (ἀρτάβας) ἑκα-
τὸν δέκα πέντε τέταρτ(ον), (γίνονται) ριε δ´.

== See also ==
- Oxyrhynchus Papyri
- Papyrus Oxyrhynchus 88
- Papyrus Oxyrhynchus 90
