= Papyrus Oxyrhynchus 72 =

Greek historical document

Papyrus Oxyrhynchus 72 (P. Oxy. 72) is a notice of a transfer of property (ἀπογραφή), written in Greek. The manuscript was written on papyrus in the form of a sheet. It was discovered by Grenfell and Hunt in 1897 in Oxyrhynchus. The document was written on 12 April 90. Currently it is housed in the Institute for the Study of Ancient Cultures in University of Chicago. The text was published by Grenfell and Hunt in 1898.

The letter was addressed by Zoilus to the keepers of the archives. It reports on behalf of Marcus Porcius, who was away, the purchase of a piece of land. The measurements of the fragment are 408 by 96 mm.

== See also ==
- Oxyrhynchus Papyri
- Papyrus Oxyrhynchus 71
- Papyrus Oxyrhynchus 73
