= Papyrus Oxyrhynchus 262 =

Greek papyrus fragment

Papyrus Oxyrhynchus 262 (P. Oxy. 262 or P. Oxy. II 262) is a fragment of a Notice of Death, in Greek. It was discovered in Oxyrhynchus. The manuscript was written on papyrus in the form of a sheet. It is dated to 21 February 61. Currently it is housed in the Columbia University (Head of Special Collections) in New York City.

== Description ==
The document was written by Sarapion, to Philiscus. Sarapion announced the death of his slave, who was by trade a weaver. The formula of a document resembles that of POxy 251, POxy 252, and POxy 253.

The measurements of the fragment are 238 by 79 mm.

It was discovered by Grenfell and Hunt in 1897 in Oxyrhynchus. The text was published by Grenfell and Hunt in 1899.

== See also ==
- Oxyrhynchus Papyri
