= Papyrus Oxyrhynchus 157 =

Greek papyrus fragment

Papyrus Oxyrhynchus 157 (P. Oxy. 157 or P. Oxy. I 157) is a letter, written in Greek and discovered in Oxyrhynchus. The manuscript was written on papyrus in the form of a sheet. The document was written in the 6th century. Currently it is housed in the Egyptian Museum (10042) in Cairo.

== Description ==
The document is a letter concerning a dispute between Papnouthius, a monk, and a scribe, about a measure of some sort. The word in question is diapismatos (διαπίσματος). The only other known use is in P. Oxy. 133, line 14. Grenfell and Hunt state that "in the absence of other parallels the meaning is doubtful." The measurements of the fragment are 132 by 306 mm.

The papyrus was discovered by Grenfell and Hunt in 1897 in Oxyrhynchus. The text was published by Grenfell and Hunt in 1898.

== See also ==
- Oxyrhynchus Papyri
- Papyrus Oxyrhynchus 156
- Papyrus Oxyrhynchus 158
