= Papyrus Oxyrhynchus 137 =

Egyptian manuscript

Papyrus Oxyrhynchus 137 (P. Oxy. 137 or P. Oxy. I 137) is the fifth in a series of Oxyrhynchus papyri (133–139) concerning the family affairs of Flavius Apion, his heirs, or his son. This one is a receipt for a water wheel axle, written in Greek and discovered in Oxyrhynchus. The manuscript was written on papyrus in the form of a sheet. The document was written on 11 January 584. Currently it is housed in the Egyptian Museum (10034) in Cairo.

== Description ==
The document consists of an acknowledgement given by Aurelius Ptollion, a cultivator, to the heirs of Flavius Apion, of the receipt of an axle for a water wheel used in irrigation. This is one of a number of similar such documents (P. Oxy. I 192-197). There are some internal inconsistencies in the document which force Grenfell and Hunt to speculate slightly in order to arrive at a plausible date. The measurements of the fragment are 320 by 200 mm.

It was discovered by Grenfell and Hunt in 1897 in Oxyrhynchus. The text was published by Grenfell and Hunt in 1898.

== Excerpt ==
Having lately had occasion to require an axle for the appliance belonging to the landlord under my charge which is called by the name of Gedius Anianus and supplies water to arable land, I went up to the city and asked your magnificence to order the axle to be provided for me. Whereupon your magnificence with due regard for the state of your property credited me in my accounts with the value of a new, proper, serviceable, and satisfactory axle, which I have received as the complement of all the machinery this fifteenth day of Tybi of the present second indiction for the water supply of the crops of the third indiction by God's help approaching. This axle is to serve the purposes of irrigation for a term of seven years, and the old one has been given to the porter.

== See also ==
- Oxyrhynchus Papyri
- Papyrus Oxyrhynchus 136
- Papyrus Oxyrhynchus 138
