= Papyrus Oxyrhynchus 140 =

Manuscript written in Greek in 550 AD

Papyrus Oxyrhynchus 140 (P. Oxy. 140 or P. Oxy. I 140) is a contract with a horse trainer, written in Greek and discovered in Oxyrhynchus. The manuscript was written on papyrus in the form of a sheet. The document was written on 26 April 550. Currently it is housed in the Egyptian Museum (10057) in Cairo.

== Description ==
The document is a contract in which Aurelius Serenus agrees to oversee a racing stable owned by Flavius Serenus, a comes. The terms of the agreement are:

1. Aurelius agrees to discharge his duties regularly and with the utmost care, unless prevented by illness.
2. Aurelius will receive for himself and his grooms 80 bushels of wheat, 9 gold solidi for barley and vegetables, 80 jars of wine, and half a solidus for greens.
3. 4.5 solidi will be paid to Aurelius as earnest money, which he will pay back double if he quits before the end of the year, and which he keeps if he is fired without cause.

The document was written by the same scribe as P. Oxy. 133. There are internal inconsistencies in the dates used in this document which force Grenfell and Hunt to make some assumptions in their calculation of its date. The measurements of the fragment are 288 by 223 mm.

It was discovered by Grenfell and Hunt in 1897 in Oxyrhynchus. The text was published by Grenfell and Hunt in 1898.

== See also ==
- Oxyrhynchus Papyri
- Papyrus Oxyrhynchus 139
- Papyrus Oxyrhynchus 141
