= Papyrus Oxyrhynchus 154 =

Ancient Greek manuscript

Papyrus Oxyrhynchus 154 (P. Oxy. 154 or P. Oxy. I 154) is an account listing various payments, written in Greek and discovered in Oxyrhynchus. The manuscript was written on papyrus in the form of a sheet. The document was written in the late 6th century. Currently it is housed in the Egyptian Museum (10102) in Cairo.

== Description ==
The recto side of this papyrus contains a list of payments of wine, oil, meat, etc., to various people. The verso contains a list of receipts and payments, partly in wheat and partly in money. The accounts on the verso side are of particular interest because of their comparisons between the relative values of different types of solidi. The measurements of the fragment are 300 by 545 mm.

It was discovered by Grenfell and Hunt in 1897 in Oxyrhynchus. The text was published by Grenfell and Hunt in 1898.

== Excerpt from verso side ==
Given to Andronicus the sailor 70 artabae, and to Anoup and John, lawyers (?) and contractors of the racecourse, as payment for the 11th indiction, 60 artabae of wheat, remainder 482 3/4 artabae, 1 choenix of wheat. This, at 1 solidus less 4 carats on the private standard for every 10 artabae, is equivalent to 48 9/32 solidi less 193 carats on the private standard, that is, less 289 1/2 carats or 12 3/48 solidi on the public standard, making 36 7/32 pure solidi on the public standard, which are equivalent to 36 15/32 solidi on the Alexandrian standard.

To the banker 12 1/8 solidi on the Alexandrian standard, also 1 solidus less 4 carats on the private standard, which is equivalent to 87/96 solidus on the standard of Alexandria, total 13 1/32 solidi on the Alexandrian standard, leaving 23 7/16 solidi on the Alexandrian standard.

== See also ==
- Oxyrhynchus Papyri
- Papyrus Oxyrhynchus 144
- Papyrus Oxyrhynchus 153
- Papyrus Oxyrhynchus 155
- Papyrus Oxyrhynchus 2024
