= Papyrus Oxyrhynchus 136 =

2nd Century historical artifact

Papyrus Oxyrhynchus 136 (P. Oxy. 136 or P. Oxy. I 136) is the fourth in a series of Oxyrhynchus papyri (133–139) concerning the family affairs of Flavius Apion, his heirs, or his son. This one is a contract between the heirs of Flavius and the overseer of a farm. It is written in Greek and was discovered in Oxyrhynchus. The manuscript was written on papyrus in the form of a sheet. The document was written on 24 May 583. Currently it is housed in the Egyptian Museum (10103) in Cairo.

== Description ==
The document contains a contract between the heirs of Flavius Apion and Serenus, with his surety Victor. Serenus agrees to become the overseer of certain estates for one year. Grenfell and Hunt note the interesting occurrence of a clause in this contract which is intended to evade newly established regulations covering such matters (see excerpt below). The measurements of the fragment are 907 by 330 mm.

It was discovered by Grenfell and Hunt in 1897 in Oxyrhynchus. The text was published by Grenfell and Hunt in 1898.

== Excerpt ==
I, Victor, surety, do further agree to become surety and bail for the aforesaid Serenus, deacon and administrator, in the discharge and fulfillment of his stewardship; and if he is shown to be in arrears in comparison with his cheques and receipts, to discharge the debt and satisfy your magnificence out of my own private means, renouncing the privilege of sureties, and contrary to the new ordinance issued about sureties and persons accepting responsibility. We both pledge for the observance of this contract all our property present and future, whether held by ourselves or by our families, to be security and to serve as a pledge.

== See also ==
- Oxyrhynchus Papyri
- Papyrus Oxyrhynchus 135
- Papyrus Oxyrhynchus 137
