= Papyrus Oxyrhynchus 145 =

Ancient Greek papyrus receipt

Papyrus Oxyrhynchus 145 (P. Oxy. 145 or P. Oxy. I 145) is a receipt, written in Greek and discovered in Oxyrhynchus. The manuscript was written on papyrus in the form of a sheet. The document was written on 15 March 552. Currently it is housed in the Egyptian Museum (10066) in Cairo.

== Description ==
The document is a receipt showing that the banker Anastasius had paid 4 carats less than one gold solidus for "an embrocation needed by the horses of the public circus on the side of the Greens." (Note: The "Greens" (Πρασίνων) were one of the two factions (the other being the "Blues") which prevailed in the major provincial towns as well as in Rome.)

The receipt also notes a payment of 1/3 solidus less 1.5 carats for expenses. The measurements of the fragment are 88 by 322 mm.

It was discovered by Grenfell and Hunt in 1897 in Oxyrhynchus. The text was published by Grenfell and Hunt in 1898.

== See also ==
- Oxyrhynchus Papyri
- Papyrus Oxyrhynchus 144
- Papyrus Oxyrhynchus 146
- Papyrus Oxyrhynchus 152
- Blues and Greens in the Byzantine Empire
