= Papyrus Oxyrhynchus 132 =

Bequest manuscript written in Greek

Papyrus Oxyrhynchus 132 (P. Oxy. 132 or P. Oxy. I 132) is a memorandum concerning the division of a bequest, written in Greek and discovered in Oxyrhynchus. The manuscript was written on papyrus in the form of a sheet. The document was written in the late 6th or early 7th century. Currently it is housed in the Egyptian Museum (10133) in Cairo.

== Description ==
The document contains a memorandum on the division of money left by Paulus to his heirs. The total amount was 360 gold solidi. It was to be shared in different proportions by Serenus, the son of Paulus, and two other men on behalf of their wives, who, according to Grenfell and Hunt, were probably Paulus' daughters. The measurements of the fragment are 335 by 235 mm.

It was discovered by Grenfell and Hunt in 1897 in Oxyrhynchus. The text was published by Grenfell and Hunt in 1898.

== See also ==
- Oxyrhynchus Papyri
- Papyrus Oxyrhynchus 131
- Papyrus Oxyrhynchus 133
