= Papyrus Oxyrhynchus 156 =

Greek papyrus fragment

Papyrus Oxyrhynchus 156 (P. Oxy. 156 or P. Oxy. I 156) is a papyrus letter, written in Greek and discovered in Oxyrhynchus. The manuscript was written on papyrus in the form of a sheet. The document was written in the 6th century. It is currently housed in the Egyptian Museum (10035) in Cairo.

== Description ==
The document is a letter from Theodorus, a secretary (chartoularios; χαρτουλάριος) and land-agent, to other secretaries and overseers. Theodorus asks that Abraham and Nicetes be made bucellarii. The measurements of the fragment are 120 by 330 mm.

It was discovered by Grenfell and Hunt in 1897 in Oxyrhynchus. The text was published by Grenfell and Hunt in 1898.

== Text ==
Recto

Please appoint Abraham and Nicetes, the letter-carriers, bucellarii from the beginning of the month Pharmouthi, and pay them their allowance of wheat, for you know that we require bucellarii. Be sure to do this without delay.

Verso

To the most illustrious and honorable secretaries and overseers from Theodorus, secretary and by the grace of God land-agent.

== See also ==
- Oxyrhynchus Papyri
- Papyrus Oxyrhynchus 155
- Papyrus Oxyrhynchus 157
