= Papyrus Oxyrhynchus 251 =

Greek papyrus fragment

Papyrus Oxyrhynchus 251 (P. Oxy. 251 or P. Oxy. II 251) is a fragment of a notice of removal, in Greek. It was discovered in Oxyrhynchus. The manuscript was written on papyrus in the form of a sheet. It is dated to 8 January 44. Currently it is housed in the British Library (Department of Manuscripts, 1186) in London.

== Description ==
It was written by Sarapion and was addressed to two officials. The document announces the removal of an individual from the place where he was registered and the fact that he was without both a profession and other means of support. These claims are attested to by an oath that proclaimed "[i]f I swear truly may it be well with me, but if falsely the reverse." Such declarations were required by law in Alexandrian Egypt because landowners often left their registered homes as a means of tax evasion. The measurements of the fragment are 325 by 95 mm. The text is written in an uncial hand.

It was discovered by Grenfell and Hunt in 1897 in Oxyrhynchus. The text was published by Grenfell and Hunt in 1899.

== See also ==
- Papyrus Oxyrhynchus 135
- Papyrus Oxyrhynchus 252
- Oxyrhynchus Papyri
