= Papyrus Oxyrhynchus 155 =

Greek papyrus fragment

Papyrus Oxyrhynchus 155 (P. Oxy. 155 or P. Oxy. I 155) is a letter, written in Greek and discovered in Oxyrhynchus. The manuscript was written on papyrus in the form of a sheet. The document was written in the 6th century. Currently it is housed in the Egyptian Museum (10020) in Cairo.

== Description ==
The recto side of the document is a letter from Theophilus to his employer John, a comes. He acknowledges the receipt of various items and asks for some favors. The verso side contains the address. The measurements of the fragment are 151 by 306 mm.

It was discovered by Grenfell and Hunt in 1897 in Oxyrhynchus. The text was published by Grenfell and Hunt in 1898.

== Text ==
Recto

I have received what your magnificence sent me through your slave Justus, namely twenty jars of wine, twenty sprigs of dates, three jars of honey, and three of rose-water (?), five pans of bread, one pot of biscuit; and I pray for long life and happiness for your magnificence and your generous house. Since your magnificence's obedient servants and their children are ill, I hope your highness will excuse my account. May your highness be pleased to send me a round pot of raphanus oil. Your highness has no longer shown care for the caparisoned colt (?), and the slave of your magnificence, Macarius.

Verso

Present this to my master, John, the all-magnificent comes and my patron, from Theophilus, citizen.

== See also ==
- Oxyrhynchus Papyri
- Papyrus Oxyrhynchus 154
- Papyrus Oxyrhynchus 156
