= Strategius Apion =

Roman Consul (539)

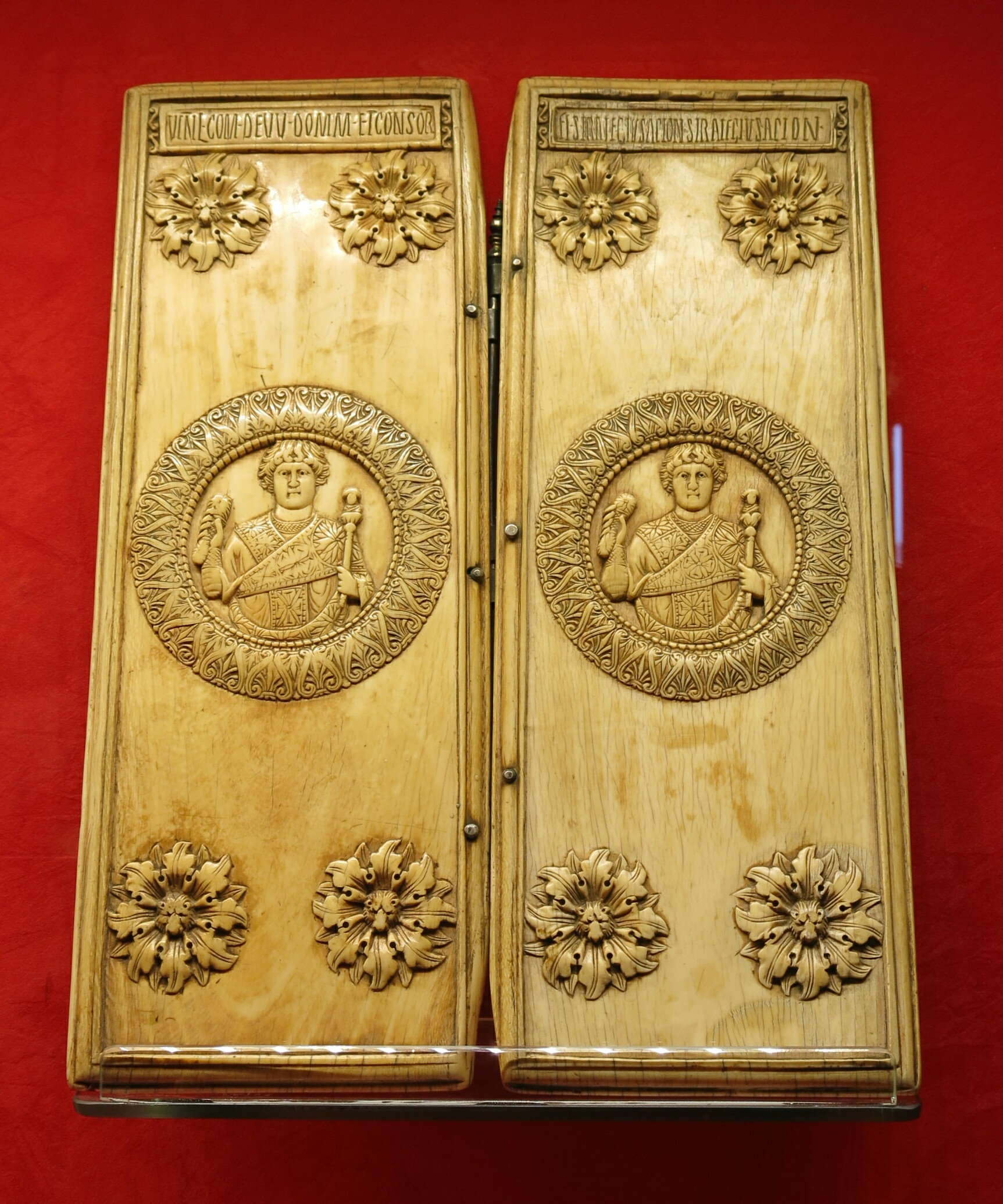
Consular diptych of Strategius Apion

Flavius Strategius Apion (Greek: Στρατήγιος Άπίων; died between 577 and 579) was a patrician and jurist of the Eastern Roman Empire and the sole Roman consul of the year 539. He was a member of the wealthy and prominent Apion family of Oxyrhynchus, Egypt.

== Biography ==
Strategius Apion was the son of a senior Strategius and a patrician in the Byzantine Empire. He had a son named Strategius, named in one of the Oxyrhynchus Papyri. This son and his wife Eusebia maintained friendly relations with Pope Gregory I, mentioned in his extant correspondence. The youngest Strategius was not the only heir of Apion mentioned in the latter's will. He shared his inheritance with Praejecta, another Apion, and Georgius. An interpretation of the text suggests Praejecta was the widow of Apion, while Strategius, Apion, and Georgius were their three sons.

Strategius Apion is mentioned variously as consul, vir illustris, and comes domesticorum during the 530s. He was a contemporary of the emperor Justinian I, by whom he is named in terms of high commendation in the 82nd Novell of Justinian's Novellae Constitutiones on account of the excellent discharge of his legal duties as the assessor of Marcellus. Perhaps owing to his legal services or to his role in the imperial household, he was made consul of the East in 539; one of the last consular diptychs, preserved in Oviedo, commemorates his consulship. Texts from circa 547-548 mention him as a patrician. Texts from circa 548/549 to 550/551 mention him as dux of the Thebaid. This position typically came with the honorific title of patrician. He is called patrician in a 556 text indicating he had already received the title. He was mentioned at the time as a stratelates and pagarch of Arsinoe. This placed him in charge of the pagarchy local to Oxyrhynchus and its vicinity.

The Oxyrhynchus Papyri preserve information about the extent of the familial estates and their business affairs. John Malalas also mentions a residence of Apion in Constantinople for an incident in May 562, when certain persons of the House of Apion hurled verbal insults at the Green faction of the Hippodrome. Apion is presumed active in the Byzantine Senate when present at Constantinople capital. He is last mentioned alive in 577, mentioned as already deceased by 579.

== Sources ==
- Martindale, John R., ed. (1992). The Prosopography of the Later Roman Empire: Volume III, AD 527–641. Cambridge: Cambridge University Press. ISBN 0-521-20160-8.

Political offices
Preceded by Marianus Michaelius Gabrielius; Archangelus John "the Cappadocian" (alone)	Roman consul 539	Succeeded by Mar. Petrus Theodorus Valentinus; Rusticius Boraides Germanus Iustinus (alone)
