= Papyrus Oxyrhynchus 143 =

Ancient Greek manuscript

Papyrus Oxyrhynchus 143 (P. Oxy. 143 or P. Oxy. I 143) contains three tax receipts, written in Greek and discovered in Oxyrhynchus. The manuscript was written on papyrus in the form of a sheet. The document was written in 535. Currently it is housed in the British Library (770) in London.

== Description ==
The document contains three receipts, written in the same hand. They are for taxes paid on account by Pamouthius, financial administrator of Leon, in the months of Tybi, Phamenoth, and Mesore (see Egyptian calendar). The three receipts are written following a precise formula, and are identical to one another except for dates, names, and amounts. The measurements of the fragment are 307 by 246 mm.

It was discovered by Grenfell and Hunt in 1897 in Oxyrhynchus. The text was published by Grenfell and Hunt in 1898.

== See also ==
- Oxyrhynchus Papyri
- Papyrus Oxyrhynchus 142
- Papyrus Oxyrhynchus 144
