= Papyrus Oxyrhynchus 142 =

6th-century Greek tax receipt

Papyrus Oxyrhynchus 142 (P. Oxy. 142 or P. Oxy. I 142) is a tax receipt, written in Greek and discovered in Oxyrhynchus. The manuscript was written on papyrus in the form of a sheet. The document was written on 15 November 534. Currently it is housed in the British Library (769) in London.

== Description ==
The document is a receipt showing that Asclas, a boatman, had received two distinct payments. The measurements of the fragment are 299 by 212 mm.

It was discovered by Grenfell and Hunt in 1897 in Oxyrhynchus. The text was published by Grenfell and Hunt in 1898.

== See also ==
- Oxyrhynchus Papyri
- Papyrus Oxyrhynchus 141
- Papyrus Oxyrhynchus 143
