= Papyrus Oxyrhynchus 153 =

Greek receipt

Papyrus Oxyrhynchus 153 (P. Oxy. 153 or P. Oxy. I 153) is a receipt, written in Greek and discovered in Oxyrhynchus. The manuscript was written on papyrus in the form of a sheet. The document was written on 20 May 618. Currently it is housed in the Egyptian Museum (10044) in Cairo.

== Description ==
The document is a receipt showing that Menas, a banker, had paid 9 solidi for three horses. The horses were bought from the inhabitants of Sephtha and given to Victor, a land agent. The measurements of the fragment are 134 by 330 mm.

It was discovered by Grenfell and Hunt in 1897 in Oxyrhynchus. The text was published by Grenfell and Hunt in 1898.

== See also ==
- Oxyrhynchus Papyri
- Papyrus Oxyrhynchus 152
- Papyrus Oxyrhynchus 154
