= Papyrus Oxyrhynchus 139 =

Egyptian manuscript

Papyrus Oxyrhynchus 139 (P. Oxy. 139 or P. Oxy. I 139) is the seventh (and last) in a series of Oxyrhynchus papyri (133–139) concerning the family affairs of Flavius Apion, his heirs, or his son. This one is a promise by the head watchman of the estate to Flavius Apion the younger to be honest and outlining the penalties the watchman agrees to should he fail. It is written in Greek and was discovered in Oxyrhynchus. The manuscript was written on papyrus in the form of a sheet. The document was written on 26 October 612. Currently it is housed in the Egyptian Museum (10049) in Cairo.

== Description ==
The document contains a contract between Aurelius Menas, head watchman, and Flavius Apion the younger. Menas agrees to pay 24 solidi should he be proved to have been a party to any theft of the agricultural estate under his charge. Grenfell and Hunt's published text of this document is supplemented with material from Papyrus 10090, also in the Egyptian Museum, which is a similar contract between Apion and two other parties, written on the previous day by the same scribe. The measurements of the fragment are 318 by 121 mm.

It was discovered by Grenfell and Hunt in 1897 in Oxyrhynchus. The text was published by Grenfell and Hunt in 1898.

== Excerpt ==
I promise to your magnificence through your representatives, that if ever at any season or time I shall be found to have stolen the gear of the machinery of the oxen, or to have committed any theft whatsoever, or to have harbored thieves, I will forfeit to your magnificence for each attempt 24 gold solidi, actual payment of which is to be enforced at the risk of myself and my property.

== See also ==
- Oxyrhynchus Papyri
- Papyrus Oxyrhynchus 138
- Papyrus Oxyrhynchus 140
