= Papyrus Oxyrhynchus 146 =

Receipt manuscript written in 555

Papyrus Oxyrhynchus 146 (P. Oxy. 146 or P. Oxy. I 146) is a receipt, written in Greek and discovered in Oxyrhynchus. The manuscript was written on papyrus in the form of a sheet. The document was written on 15 November 555. Currently it is housed in the Egyptian Museum (10076) in Cairo.

== Description ==
This and the two subsequent papyri (P. Oxy. 147 and 148) are receipts for payments made by the monks of the monastery of Andreas. This one records a payment to Serenus, a stableman, for carrying hay and chaff from the barn belonging to the landlord to the stable of the monastery. The measurements of the fragment are 80 by 298 mm.

It was discovered by Grenfell and Hunt in 1897 in Oxyrhynchus. The text was published by Grenfell and Hunt in 1898.

== See also ==
- Oxyrhynchus Papyri
- Papyrus Oxyrhynchus 145
- Papyrus Oxyrhynchus 147
- Papyrus Oxyrhynchus 148
