= Papyrus Oxyrhynchus 134 =

Egyptian manuscript

Papyrus Oxyrhynchus 134 (P. Oxy. 134 or P. Oxy. I 134) is the second in a series of Oxyrhynchus papyri (133–139) concerning the family affairs of Flavius Apion, his heirs, or his son. This one is a receipt from a stonemason given to Flavius. It is written in Greek and was discovered in Oxyrhynchus. The manuscript was written on papyrus in the form of a sheet. The document was written on 9 June 569. Currently it is housed in the Egyptian Museum (10053) in Cairo.

== Description ==
The document consists of an acknowledgement given to Flavius Apius by John, a chief stonemason, that he had received one gold solidus. In exchange, John agrees to transport 200 blocks of stone to a cistern (λάκκος) on Flavius Apion's estate. Grenfell and Hunt note that in 1898 some ancient stone quarries to the north of Oxyrhynchus were still being worked. The measurements of the fragment are 315 by 103 mm.

It was discovered by Grenfell and Hunt in 1897 in Oxyrhynchus. The text was published by Grenfell and Hunt in 1898.

== See also ==
- Oxyrhynchus Papyri
- Papyrus Oxyrhynchus 133
- Papyrus Oxyrhynchus 135
