= Papyrus Oxyrhynchus 135 =

Ancient papyrus

Papyrus Oxyrhynchus 135 (P. Oxy. 135 or P. Oxy. I 135) is the third in a series of Oxyrhynchus papyri (133–139) concerning the family affairs of Flavius Apion, his heirs, or his son. This one is a deed of surety, written in Greek and discovered in Oxyrhynchus. The manuscript was written on papyrus in the form of a sheet. The document was written on 21 March 579. Currently it is housed in the Egyptian Museum (10018) in Cairo.

== Description ==
The document contains a binding agreement by a worker in lead, Aurelius Pamouthius, guaranteeing to the heirs of Flavius Apion that Aurelius Abraham, a worker, would remain with his wife and family on an estate belonging to those heirs. Note that Grenfell and Hunt carried out a detailed analysis to determine the date of this document, and had to make a few speculative leaps to arrive at a satisfactory conclusion. The measurements of the fragment are 320 by 195 mm.

It was discovered by Grenfell and Hunt in 1897 in Oxyrhynchus. The text was published by Grenfell and Hunt in 1898.

== Text ==
In the 4th year of the reign of our most godly and pious sovereign and greatest benefactor Fl. Tiberius Constantius, eternal Augustus and Imperator, Phamenoth 25, 12th indiction.

To the most magnificent heirs of Apion, of glorious memory, patrician, landholders in this illustrious city of Oxyrhynchus, through Menas their servant who is acting on their behalf and assuming for his masters, the said all-esteemed persons, the conduct and responsibility of the transaction, from Aurelius Pamouthius, lead-worker, son of George and Anniana, coming from the city of Oxyrhynchus. I agree of my own free will and with the oath by Heaven and the Emperor to be surety and pledge to your magnificence, through your representatives, for Aurelius Abraham, son of Herminus and Herais, who comes from the estate of Great Tarouthnus belonging to your magnificence in the Oxyrhynchite nome, and is entered as your laborer. I engage that he shall continually abide and stay on his holding along with his friends and wife and herds and all his possessions, and be responsible for all that regards his person or the fortunes of him who has been entered as a cultivator; and that he shall in no wise leave his holding or remove to another place, and if he is required of me by your magnificence through your representatives at any date or for any reason whatsoever, I will bring him forward and produce him in a public place without any attempt at flight or excuse, in the keeping of your same honored house just as he is now when I become his surety. If I do not do this I agree to forfeit for his nonappearance and my failure to produce him 8 gold solidi, actual payment of which is to be enforced. This pledge, of which only this copy is made, is valid, and in answer to the formal question I have given by assent.

Executed by me, Anastasius.

== See also ==
- Oxyrhynchus Papyri
- Papyrus Oxyrhynchus 134
- Papyrus Oxyrhynchus 136
