= Papyrus Oxyrhynchus 138 =

7th century Greek language manuscript

Papyrus Oxyrhynchus 138 (P. Oxy. 138 or P. Oxy. I 138) is the sixth in a series of Oxyrhynchus papyri (133–139) concerning the family affairs of Flavius Apion, his heirs, or his son. This one is a contract for the care of a stable, written in Greek and discovered in Oxyrhynchus. The manuscript was written on papyrus in the form of a sheet. The document was written between 610 and 611. Currently it is housed in the Egyptian Museum (10100) in Cairo.

== Description ==
The document contains a contract between Flavius Apion the younger and John, "contractor of the racecourse" belonging to Flavius Apion. John agrees to be responsible for Apion's stable for one year, as well as for the racetrack. John also agrees to provide Apion with animals as required, in return for 72 solidi of gold. Grenfell and Hunt note that the number of references to this racetrack in the Oxyrhychus papyri of this period mean that it was very popular. The measurements of the fragment are 988 by 335 mm.

It was discovered by Grenfell and Hunt in 1897 in Oxyrhynchus. The text was published by Grenfell and Hunt in 1898.

== See also ==
- Oxyrhynchus Papyri
- Papyrus Oxyrhynchus 137
- Papyrus Oxyrhynchus 139
