= Papyrus Oxyrhynchus 151 =

Greek papyrus fragment

Papyrus Oxyrhynchus 151 (P. Oxy. 151 or P. Oxy. I 151) is a receipt, written in Greek and discovered in Oxyrhynchus. The manuscript was written on papyrus in the form of a sheet. The document was written between 28 September and 27 October 612. Currently it is housed in the Egyptian Museum (10094) in Cairo.

== Description ==
The document is a receipt showing that Macarius, a banker, had paid 3 solidi less 12 carats to some boatmen who were to go to Alexandria and bring a lawyer back to Oxyrhynchus. The measurements of the fragment are 110 by 323 mm.

It was discovered by Grenfell and Hunt in 1897 in Oxyrhynchus. The text was published by Grenfell and Hunt in 1898.

== See also ==
- Oxyrhynchus Papyri
- Papyrus Oxyrhynchus 150
- Papyrus Oxyrhynchus 152
