= Papyrus Oxyrhynchus 148 =

Greek papyrus fragment

Papyrus Oxyrhynchus 148 (P. Oxy. 148 or P. Oxy. I 148) is a receipt, written in Greek and discovered in Oxyrhynchus. The manuscript was written on papyrus in the form of a sheet. The document was written on 12 April 556. Currently it is housed in the Egyptian Museum (10075) in Cairo.

== Description ==
This and the two previous papyri (P. Oxy. 146 and 147) are receipts for payments made by the monks of the monastery of Andreas. This one records a payment made by Melas, head of the monastery, to Justus, a bath attendant, for four mats for the use of the porters of certain buildings. The measurements of the fragment are 53 by 288 mm.

It was discovered by Grenfell and Hunt in 1897 in Oxyrhynchus. The text was published by Grenfell and Hunt in 1898.

== See also ==
- Oxyrhynchus Papyri
- Papyrus Oxyrhynchus 146
- Papyrus Oxyrhynchus 147
- Papyrus Oxyrhynchus 149
