= Papyrus Oxyrhynchus 149 =

Greek papyrus fragment

Papyrus Oxyrhynchus 149 (P. Oxy. 149 or P. Oxy. I 149) is a receipt, written in Greek and discovered in Oxyrhynchus. The manuscript was written on papyrus in the form of a sheet. The document was written on 22 September 572. Currently it is housed in the Egyptian Museum (10045) in Cairo.

== Description ==
The document consists of a receipt for 48 solidi paid by Theodorus, a tax collector. The measurements of the fragment are 120 by 323 mm.

It was discovered by Grenfell and Hunt in 1897 in Oxyrhynchus. The text was published by Grenfell and Hunt in 1898.

== See also ==
- Oxyrhynchus Papyri
- Papyrus Oxyrhynchus 148
- Papyrus Oxyrhynchus 150
