= Papyrus Oxyrhynchus 141 =

Greek papyrus

Papyrus Oxyrhynchus 141 (P. Oxy. 141 or P. Oxy. I 141) is an order to a butler to make some payments of wine, written in Greek and discovered in Oxyrhynchus. The manuscript was written on papyrus in the form of a sheet. The document was written on 19 December 503. Currently it is housed in the Egyptian Museum (10096) in Cairo.

== Description ==
The document contains an order from John, a comes, to his butler, Phoebammon, to make certain payments of wine to various individuals. The recipients include Sepho and Kesmouchis, who had brought cakes (?), a carpenter, a policeman, some fishermen, the porter of the monastery or church of St. John, and guards who protected estates on the further bank, probably of the Bahr Yussef. The measurements of the fragment are 110 by 316 mm.

It was discovered by Grenfell and Hunt in 1897 in Oxyrhynchus. The text was published by Grenfell and Hunt in 1898.

== See also ==
- Oxyrhynchus Papyri
- Papyrus Oxyrhynchus 140
- Papyrus Oxyrhynchus 142
