= Papyrus Oxyrhynchus 131 =

Greek manuscript

Papyrus Oxyrhynchus 131 (P. Oxy. 131 or P. Oxy. I 131) is a letter concerning a disputed inheritance, written in Greek and discovered in Oxyrhynchus. The manuscript was written on papyrus in the form of a sheet. The document was written in the 6th or 7th century. Currently it is housed in the Egyptian Museum (10063) in Cairo.

== Description ==
The document contains a petition by Sousneus to an unnamed person, asking him to intervene in a dispute between Sousneus and his younger brother over the division of their father's property. Grenfell and Hunt assert that the author is of Jewish descent, based on the names mentioned in the letter as well as the style of the Greek used. The measurements of the fragment are 364 by 253 mm.

It was discovered by Grenfell and Hunt in 1897 in Oxyrhynchus. The text was published by Grenfell and Hunt in 1898.

== Text ==
To my kind lord next to God, entreaty and supplication, from me, Sousneus, your miserable slave, of Patani. I beg to inform my kind lord of my case, which is as follows. When my father was alive, he summoned me and my brothers and sisters and said "One of you shall possess the land of your mother Jo..aphe, which the others get their livelihood from my land"; and he raised up David my younger brother and assigned to him the estate of my mother. And when he was on the point of death my father ordered David to be given half an aroura out of his own land, saying that that was enough for him, since he had his mother's estate. And lo, it is today three years since he died. Immediately after his death I went to Abraham, the overseer of Claudianus, and he brought the witnesses who were appointed to act for my father, that is, Julius the elder and Apollos. And he caused everything to be done in accordance with the word of my father; and year by year I sowed my land and David my brother sowed the land of my mother and his own half-aroura. But today Abraham suborned (?) by this David lay in wait for me, and said that my brother must have for himself my mother's land and the half-aroura which my father gave him, and that all that my father left me must be divided again between himself and me. Now my father gave to my mother 110 solidi to divide between me and my brothers and sisters, and this she gave to Elizabeth my elder sister. And I beseech my kind lord to see that my rights are maintained in accordance with my father's word.

== See also ==
- Oxyrhynchus Papyri
- Papyrus Oxyrhynchus 130
- Papyrus Oxyrhynchus 132
