= Papyrus Oxyrhynchus 147 =

Ancient Greek manuscript

Papyrus Oxyrhynchus 147 (P. Oxy. 147 or P. Oxy. I 147) is a receipt, written in Greek and discovered in Oxyrhynchus. The manuscript was written on papyrus in the form of a sheet. The document was written on 7 April 556. Currently it is housed in the Egyptian Museum (10074) in Cairo.

== Description ==
This and the two surrounding papyri (P. Oxy. 146 and 148) are receipts for payments made by the monks of the monastery of Andreas. The present receipt is for a "rope or coil" provided by the monks for "the machine in the garden of the Holy Mary for raising water to fill the holy font." There are internal inconsistencies in the dating of the document, which have required Grenfell and Hunt to make assumptions regarding the correct date. The measurements of the fragment are 58 by 310 mm.

It was discovered by Grenfell and Hunt in 1897 in Oxyrhynchus. The text was published by Grenfell and Hunt in 1898.

== See also ==
- Oxyrhynchus Papyri
- Papyrus Oxyrhynchus 146
- Papyrus Oxyrhynchus 148
