= Papyrus Oxyrhynchus 158 =

Greek papyrus fragment

Papyrus Oxyrhynchus 158 (P. Oxy. 158 or P. Oxy. I 158) is a letter, written in Greek and discovered in Oxyrhynchus. The manuscript was written on papyrus in the form of a sheet. The document was written in the 6th or 7th century. Currently it is housed in the Egyptian Museum (10043) in Cairo.

== Description ==
The document is a letter from Victor to Cosmas, a comes, concerning two bricklayers who had left their work without finishing it. The measurements of the fragment are 115 by 325 mm.

It was discovered by Grenfell and Hunt in 1897 in Oxyrhynchus. The text was published by Grenfell and Hunt in 1898. It is the last of the 158 papyri published in detail in Grenfell and Hunt's first volume of papyri. The balance, P. Oxy. 159 through P. Oxy. 207, are only described briefly, although they were eventually published elsewhere, many in later volumes of Grenfell and Hunt's series.

== Text ==
Two bricklayers from Tampeti were brought to Ibion, and I urge you, my true and illustrious brother, to order the overseer of Tampeti to take security of them, against their absconding again and leaving their work half done. I write with many expressions of respect for your eminence, and entreat you to take every opportunity of writing to me about the state of your eminence's health.

== See also ==
- Oxyrhynchus Papyri
- Papyrus Oxyrhynchus 157
- Oxyrhynchus Papyri 159 through 207
