= Papyrus Oxyrhynchus 150 =

Greek papyrus fragment

Papyrus Oxyrhynchus 150 (P. Oxy. 150 or P. Oxy. I 150) is a receipt, written in Greek and discovered in Oxyrhynchus. The manuscript was written on papyrus in the form of a sheet. The document was written on 7 October 590. Currently it is housed in the Egyptian Museum (10051) in Cairo.

== Description ==
The document is a receipt showing that Phoebammon, a butler, had paid 3.5 jars of wine "to the 14 bucellarii of Heracleopolis and Koma who had come on account of the fight..." The measurements of the fragment are 63 by 322 mm.

It was discovered by Grenfell and Hunt in 1897 in Oxyrhynchus. The text was published by Grenfell and Hunt in 1898.

== See also ==
- Oxyrhynchus Papyri
- Papyrus Oxyrhynchus 149
- Papyrus Oxyrhynchus 151
