= Papyrus Oxyrhynchus 253 =

Greek papyrus fragment

Papyrus Oxyrhynchus 253 (P. Oxy. 253 or P. Oxy. II 253) is a fragment of a notice of removal, in Greek. It was discovered in Oxyrhynchus. The manuscript was written on papyrus in the form of a sheet. It is dated to 25 July - 23 August 19. Currently it is housed in the Universitätsbibliothek Graz in Graz.

== Description ==
The document is similar to POxy 252 but dated a year earlier. It was written by Thoönis, son of Ammonius, and was addressed to Theon and Eutychides. The document announces the removal of an individual from the place where he was registered. The document is not complete, but the lacunae can be filled in from POxy 252, which is similar. Probably POxy 252 was not addressed to the same officials as POxy 253.

The measurements of the fragment are 193 by 130 mm. The text is written in an uncial hand.

It was discovered by Grenfell and Hunt in 1897 in Oxyrhynchus. The text was published by Grenfell and Hunt in 1899.

== See also ==
- Oxyrhynchus Papyri
