= Papyrus Oxyrhynchus 133 =

Egyptian manuscript

Papyrus Oxyrhynchus 133 (P. Oxy. 133 or P. Oxy. I 133) is the first in a series of Oxyrhynchus papyri (133–139) concerning the family affairs of Flavius Apion, his heirs, or his son. This one is a receipt for 200 artabae of seed corn. It is written in Greek and was discovered in Oxyrhynchus. The manuscript was written on papyrus in the form of a sheet. The document was written in 550. Currently it is housed in the Egyptian Museum (10056) in Cairo.

== Description ==
The measurements of the fragment are 325 by 307 mm.

It was discovered by Grenfell and Hunt in 1897 in Oxyrhynchus. The text was published by Grenfell and Hunt in 1898.

== Text ==
In the 24th year of the reign of our most godly and pious sovereign Fl. Justinian, the eternal Augustus and Imperator, which is the 8th year after the consulship of Fl. Basilius the most illustrious, Phaophi 22, 14th indiction, in the city of Oxyrhynchus.

To Flavius Apion the all-honored and most magnificent, of consular rank, a landowner at this illustrious city of Oxyrhynchus, through Menas his servant who is acting on his behalf and assuming for his master the same all-honored Apion the conduct and responsibility of the transaction, from the council of the chief men of the village of Takona, in the Oxyrhynchite nome, which village is dependent upon your honor's house, through us, Aurelius Phoebammon, overseer, son of Pekusius, Aurelius Anoup, son of Aritsi, Aurelius Menas, his brother, Aurelius Koulaetb, son of John, Aurelius Anoup, son of Priscus, Aurelius Heraclides, son of Palmas, Aurelius Phib, son of Julius, and the other officials of this village, greeting. We acknowledge that we have received from your honor on loan and have had measured out to us from the harvest of the present 14th indiction as seed for the crops of our lands in the approaching (D.V.) 15th indiction, two hundred artabae of uncleansed corn by measure, given to us by the heirs of the sainted Menas, son of Osklas, captain of a boat belonging to your honored house, total 200 artabae corn. We will pay back without fail to your honor the same amount of corn, new and sifted, according to the measure by which we received it, along with the tax payable by us in the month Payni of the current 227th=the 196th year and of the present 14th indiction, out of the new crops of the coming (D.V.) 15th indiction, without delay and on the security of all our property which is thereto pledged. This bond, of which this copy only is made, is valid, and in reply to the formal question we have given our assent. [Second hand] The council of the chief men of the village of Takona in the Oxyrhynchite nome, through the names herein above written, (has given) to your honor this bond for two hundred artabae of uncleansed corn by measure, total 200 artab. uncl. corn, which we will pay back at the date fixed; and we agree to all that is herein contained as it is above written, and in answer to the formal question have given our consent and discharge. I, Aurelius Heraclides, scribe of the village of Takona, signed for them at their request, as they were illiterate. Executed by me, Philoxenus.

== See also ==
- Oxyrhynchus Papyri
- Papyrus Oxyrhynchus 132
- Papyrus Oxyrhynchus 134
