= Papyrus Oxyrhynchus 144 =

Egyptian manuscript

Papyrus Oxyrhynchus 144 (P. Oxy. 144 or P. Oxy. I 144) is a receipt, written in Greek and discovered in Oxyrhynchus. The manuscript was written on papyrus in the form of a sheet. The document was written on 22 November 580. Currently it is housed in the Egyptian Museum (10017) in Cairo.

== Description ==
The document is an acknowledgement of the receipt of various sums of money which were to be taken to Alexandria. The document has been crossed out, showing that the contract had been fulfilled. The measurements of the fragment are 408 by 323 mm.

It was discovered by Grenfell and Hunt in 1897 in Oxyrhynchus. The text was published by Grenfell and Hunt in 1898.

== Text ==
I have received from your magnificence through John your most distinguished banker for the revenues of the third installment of the thirteenth indiction 1440 gold solidi in pure coin and 720 solidi in independent (?) Egyptian coin according to the standard of Alexandria, with 45 solidi to make up the deficiency in purity, total 2205 gold solidi. This sum I am prepared to take to Alexandria, apart from accidents sent by Heaven and dangers and mischances by river, and to pay it to John and Simeonius the most illustrious money-changers and to bring a written receipt from the most illustrious agent Theodorus to the effect that the aforesaid sum has been paid in full. For your security or that of the said most distinguished banker I have drawn up the present acknowledgement of deposit written with my own hand this 26th day of Athyr, 14th indiction.

== See also ==
- Oxyrhynchus Papyri
- Papyrus Oxyrhynchus 143
- Papyrus Oxyrhynchus 145
