= Papyrus Oxyrhynchus 252 =

Greek papyrus fragment

Papyrus Oxyrhynchus 252 (P. Oxy. 252 or P. Oxy. II 252) is a fragment of a notice of removal, in Greek. It was discovered in Oxyrhynchus. The manuscript was written on papyrus in the form of a sheet. It is dated to the year 19-20. Current location of fragment is unknown.

== Description ==
The document is similar to P. Oxy. 251. It was written by Thoönis, son of Ammonius, and was addressed to Theon and Eutychides. The document announces that Thoönis's brother Ammonius, a professional weaver, was without means of support and had left his registered residence. The document is not complete, but the lacunae can be filled in from POxy 253, which is similar, although it's possible that POxy 253 was not addressed to the same officials as this papyrus.

The measurements of the fragment are 165 by 97 mm. The text is written in an uncial hand.

It was discovered by Grenfell and Hunt in 1897 in Oxyrhynchus. The text was published by Grenfell and Hunt in 1899.

== See also ==
- Oxyrhynchus Papyri
