= Papyrus Oxyrhynchus 152 =

Artifact

Papyrus Oxyrhynchus 152 (P. Oxy. 152 or P. Oxy. I 152) is a receipt, written in Greek and discovered in Oxyrhynchus. The manuscript was written on papyrus in the form of a sheet. The document was written on 1 March 618. Currently it is housed in the Egyptian Museum (10048) in Cairo.

== Description ==
The document is a receipt showing that Georgius, a secretary, had paid 10 and 5/8 carats to two men employed at the hippodrome on the side of the Blues (Βενέτων). The measurements of the fragment are 84 by 345 mm.

It was discovered by Grenfell and Hunt in 1897 in Oxyrhynchus. The text was published by Grenfell and Hunt in 1898.

== See also ==
- Oxyrhynchus Papyri
- Papyrus Oxyrhynchus 151
- Papyrus Oxyrhynchus 153
- Blues and Greens in the Byzantine Empire
