= Jean Gascou =

French scholar and papyrologist

Jean Gascou (born 16 May 1945, Cambrai) is a French scholar and papyrologist. He is a professor at the Paris-Sorbonne University, director of the Institute of Papyrology and a member of the Institut Universitaire de France.

== Selected publications ==
Jean Gascou is the author of several works:

- Gascou, Jean (1994). Un codex fiscal hermopolite. Atlanta.
- Gascou, Jean (2004). La pétition à Byzance. Paris: Centre d'Histoire et Civilisation de Byzance.
- Gascou, Jean (2003). Étude copte IX. Onzième journée d'étude. Strasbourg.
- Gascou, Jean (2006). Sophrone de Jérusalem, miracles des saints Cyr et Jean, traduction commentée. Paris.
- Gascou, Jean (2008). Fiscalité et société en Égypte byzantine. Paris.
