= Apion family =

5th/7th century clan of landholders in Byzantine Egypt

Apion Ἀπίων
- Country: Byzantine Empire
- Founder: Apion I
- Final head: Strategius III
- Historic seat: Oxyrhynchus
- Connected members: Strategius Apion

The Apion family (Greek: Ἀπίων, plural: Ἀπίωνες; Latin: Apiones) was a wealthy clan of landholders in Byzantine Egypt, especially in the Middle Egyptian nomes of Oxyrhynchus, Arsinoe and Heracleopolis Magna. Beginning as a local aristocracy, it rose to prominence in the 5th, 6th and early 7th centuries when several successive heads of the family occupied high imperial offices, including the consulship. After the Sasanian conquest of Egypt, the family disappeared.

The history of the Apion family is chronicled in the Oxyrhynchus Papyri, a series of manuscripts dating from 32 BC to 640 AD. Members of the family held the positions of comes sacri consistorii, comes sacrarum largitionum, and comes domesticorum, with Apion II (also known as Strategius Apion) obtaining the role of consul. After the collapse of the Western Roman Empire, the family dominated the political scene in Byzantine Egypt, holding vast swathes of Middle Egyptian property through the acquisition of landed estates. Despite their influence in Egypt, the family largely remained in Constantinople as absentee landlords.

== History ==
Map of Roman Egypt

The origin of the Apion family is uncertain. There is no evidence that Aurelius Apion, who was augustalian prefect of Egypt before 328, and Flavius Strategius, comes and praeses of Thebais, belonged to the family, despite bearing its names (Strategius being a maiden name). However, Strategius I, the family's earliest known ancestor, is referenced in a series of papyri from Oxyrhynchus. He served as an administrator in the imperial estates (the domus divina) in the 430s, eventually rising to head administrator of the domus divina in the entire Oxyrhynchite nome. Strategius later advanced to the title of comes sacri consistorii and the rank of vir spectabilis, dying before December of 469. He is known to have had one daughter, Isis, who may have married the man thought to be the first member of the family, Apion I, who descended from another prominent line of local aristocracy, the Septimii Flaviani of neighbouring Heracleopolis Magna. His father, Flavianus, had served as the comes sacrarum largitionum in Constantinople.

From a local position in Oxyrhynchus in 492, Apion I rose to become honorary consul (apo hypaton) by 497 and then patrikios by 503. He was responsible for provisioning the Byzantine forces in the Anastasian War (502–506) against Sasanian Persia, but fell out of favour with Emperor Anastasius I. Subsequently, he was exiled and forcibly ordained as a priest in 510, only to be recalled by Justin I in 518 and made praetorian prefect of the East. Sometime between 525 and 532, he was converted with his family to Chalcedonian orthodoxy, abjuring Monophysitism.

Apion I had two sons, Herakleidas and Strategius II. Herakleidas is an obscure figure; although possibly the elder of the two, he is known only to have served as city elder (principalis) at Heracleopolis, and to have been ordained a deacon at the time of his father's disgrace in 510. Strategius II is attested as a curialis in 489, was comes domesticorum in 497 and honorary consul and honorary magister militum by 518. He served as augustalian prefect sometime before 523. Under Justinian I, he became a patrikios, was sent as an envoy to the Persians during the Iberian War, and served as comes sacrarum largitionum in 535–538. Among his duties in the latter post was overseeing the reconstruction of the Hagia Sophia, after its destruction in the Nika riots. He died in early 542.

Strategius II was married to a certain Leontia. Their son, Apion II, received the ordinary consulship in the year 539 just shortly after he came of age, marking the family's political apogee. At the time, he also held the title of comes domesticorum like his father. In later life he became a patrikios and protopatrikios, which placed him among the senior-most members of the Byzantine Senate. Earlier works considered him as having been—possibly by proxy, with Apion himself remaining at Constantinople—a provincial governor in Egypt (serving as dux Thebaidos c. 548–550 and pagarch in the Arsinoite nome ca. 556), but according to more recent research, these posts were most likely held by other members of the Apion family.

Apion II died in 578 or 579, and his inheritance was controlled collectively for eight years by mostly unnamed heirs, after which there were three named heirs: the hypatissa Flavia Praeiecta, either the daughter of Apion II or his daughter-in-law (she appears to have been married to a Strategius), and her two sons, George and Apion III. George is last attested in 590 and Praiecta in 591, after which Apion III remained the sole heir of the Oxyrhynchus estates. Apion III married Eusebia, a scion of the Roman senatorial family of the Anicii, and had at least one son, Strategius IV. Letters of Pope Gregory the Great mention the family living in Constantinople at this time. An honorary consul and patrikios by 604/5, Apion III died in late 619 or early January 620, a fact possibly connected with the Sassanid conquest of Egypt in the same period. There is evidence that the Apion household existed under Persian occupation until August 626, but not after this date.

Another important member of the family, from a collateral branch of the family resident in the Heracleopolite and Arsinoite nomes, was another Strategius (known as "pseudo-Strategius III" in some sources). He is first attested in 591, and, like his contemporary Apion III, was an honorary consul and patrikios, as well as pagarch in the Heracleopolite and Arsinoite nomes. He was involved in the reconciliation of the Syrian and Egyptian Monophysite Churches in 616, but both he and his family disappear after the Persian conquest.

== Social position in Egypt ==
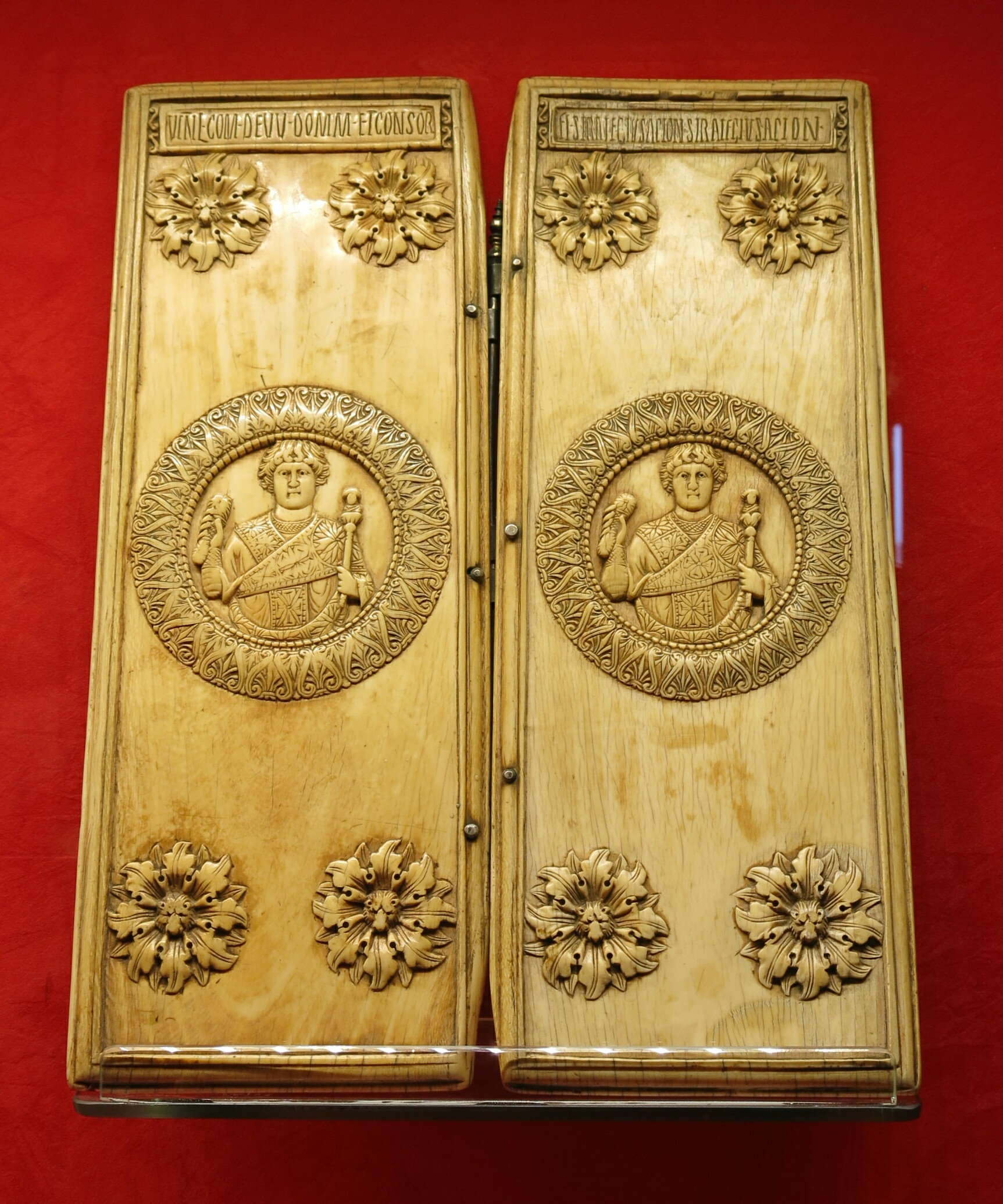
Consular diptych of Strategius Apion

The Apion family originally belonged to the local municipal aristocracy (curiales), and rose to power and influence through imperial service. In this sense, the Apiones typify the phenomenon, attested across the late Roman world, of local aristocratic families using the opportunities opened up by the expansion of the state bureaucracy in the 4th century to secure positions with the imperial civil service. This new "aristocracy of service" derived from this association both prestige and wealth, which allowed it to out-compete local rivals and establish an economic and political predominance in its home localities. This was chiefly expressed in their acquisition of large estates, in which they were helped by the monetization of the economy and the introduction of the gold solidus as the main currency, to which they, as salaried officials, had better access than their rivals.

The Apiones in particular came to hold very extensive properties in several Middle Egyptian nomes, as attested by hundreds of papyri relating to their administration. In the Oxyrhynchite nome alone, the Apiones are held to have 75,000 acres (30,000 ha), or about two fifths of the available arable land. Lack of data for the estates in the neighbouring nomes, as well as the fact that their holdings were not contiguous, does not permit a similar estimate, but their property must have been similarly extensive. Like other great land-holdings of the time, the Apion estates were divided in two categories: land directly exploited by the Apion household (autourgia), and allotments (ktemata) leased to farmers of villages (choria, epoikia, or komai) belonging to the estate.

Earlier studies, based on Edward Rochie Hardy's The Large Estates of Byzantine Egypt (1931), believed that after the middle of the 6th century, the Apiones returned from Constantinople to Egypt, abandoning their imperial affiliations in favour of local offices, and even re-converting to Monophysitism. This view was rejected by Jean Gascou in 1985, and is no longer held. Instead, the Apiones, or at least the heads of the family, are shown to have been mostly absentee landlords, staying in Constantinople close to the imperial court, rather than Egypt. Accordingly, the dispersed Apion estates were governed by an extensive "private bureaucracy" which included its own postal service, modelled after the imperial cursus publicus, with both an "express" courier service and a slower post, both by land and by river.

Papyri also make clear that the Apiones exercised extensive authority locally, possessing both a private jailhouse and a private police force (bucellarii), often of foreign (e.g. Gothic) origin. As James G. Keenan writes, these facts, along with the existence of serfs (coloni adscripticii) in the great estates, "are most responsible for the impression that the Apion household, that Oxyrhynchus with its other great landlords, that late antique Egypt as a whole was 'feudal' in the medieval sense of the term, and that the great houses of Egypt were resistant to and in conflict with the imperial government". This belief has been modified in recent times towards an image of toleration and tacit approval by the imperial government of the great houses' local power, and cooperation between the two sides. For instance, the great landholding families assumed the maintenance of the irrigation works, from which depended not only the provincial economy, but also Constantinople's grain supply.

== Sources ==
- Frend, W.H.C. (1991). Atiya, Aziz Suryal (ed.). The Coptic Encyclopedia. Vol. 1. Macmillan Publishers. ISBN 978-0-02-897036-3.
- Hickey, Todd (2012). Wine, Wealth, and the State in Late Antique Egypt: The House of Apion at Oxyrhynchus. University of Michigan Press. ISBN 978-0-472-11812-0.
- Kazhdan, Alexander (1991). "Apion". In Kazhdan, Alexander (ed.). The Oxford Dictionary of Byzantium. Oxford and New York: Oxford University Press. pp. 130–131. ISBN 0-19-504652-8.
- Keenan, James G. (2000). "Egypt". In Cameron, Averil; Ward-Perkins, Bryan; Whitby, Michael (eds.). The Cambridge Ancient History, Volume XIV - Late Antiquity: Empire and Successors, A.D. 425–600. Cambridge University Press. pp. 612–637. ISBN 978-0-521-32591-2.
- Martindale, John R.; Jones, A. H. M.; Morris, John, eds. (1971). The Prosopography of the Later Roman Empire: Volume I, AD 260–395. Cambridge: Cambridge University Press. ISBN 0-521-07233-6.
- Martindale, John R., ed. (1980). The Prosopography of the Later Roman Empire: Volume II, AD 395–527. Cambridge: Cambridge University Press. ISBN 0-521-20159-4.
- Martindale, John R., ed. (1992). The Prosopography of the Later Roman Empire: Volume III, AD 527–641. Cambridge: Cambridge University Press. ISBN 0-521-20160-8.
- Sarris, Peter (2009). "Social Relations and the Land: The Early Period". In Haldon, John (ed.). A Social History of Byzantium. Wiley-Blackwell. pp. 92–111. ISBN 978-1-4443-0591-3.
