= Verelst =

Verelst is a surname. Notable people with the surname include:

- Adriana Verelst (c. 1683-1769), English portrait painter
- Charles Verelst (1814–1859), architect
- Cornelis Verelst (1667–1734), supposedly an English painter but probably a misnaming of William Verelst (1651–1702)
- Harry Verelst (1734–1785), British colonial administrator
- Harry Verelst (1846–1918), English cricketer
- Herman Verelst (1641–1699), Anglo-Dutch painter, especially of portraits
- John Verelst (1648–1679), Anglo-Dutch painter
- John Verelst (c. 1670–1734), English portrait painter
- Lodvick Verelst (1668-1704), English portrait painter
- Maria Verelst (1680–1744), supposedly an English painter but probably a misnaming of Adriana Verelst (c. 1683-1769)
- Michael Verelst (c. 1675-1752), English painter
- Pieter Hermansz Verelst (c. 1616–1668), Dutch Golden Age painter
- Simon Pietersz Verelst (1644–c. 1710-1717), Anglo-Dutch painter of portraits but particularly famous for flower pieces
- Steve Verelst (born 1987), Belgian footballer
- William Verelst (1651–1702), Anglo-Dutch flower painter
- William Verelst (1704–1752), English portrait painter
