= Cornelis Verelst =

Supposed Anglo-Dutch painter

Cornelis Verelst was supposedly an Anglo-Dutch artist, a brother or nephew of Simon Verelst and who painted flower pieces. This account of his life has been largely based on the writings of Jacob Campo Weyerman who admitted to knowing little of the artist. There is no archival evidence for Cornelis Verelst. It seems likely that Weyerman was referring to William Verelst (1651-1702), John Verelst (1648-1679) or John Verelst (c. 1670-1734), or has conflated two or more of these lives.

== Biography ==
Recent scholarship has cast doubt on the existence of Cornelis Verelst. The Allgemeines Künstlerlexikon notes the uncertainty of his dates of birth and death and supplies a few details of his life based on Herman Verelst’s life (which presupposes he was Herman’s son), noting that the RKD does not record any signed and dated works. (Note: "Lt RKD sind on keine sign. Werke bekannt.") Sam Segal doubted that Cornelis existed as did Paul Taylor in the Dictionary of National Biography. There is no archival evidence of Cornelis Verelst.

== Historiography ==
Jacob Campo Weyerman gives a brief summary of “Kornelis Verelst”. This gives almost no information beyond that Cornelis was the brother or nephew of Simon Verelst and a good flower painter. Weyerman had spent time in London between 1704 and 1720 and knew Simon but had not met and did not know Cornelis.

Later authors follow Weyerman, sometimes adding details usually inferences based on an assumption, for instance that Herman Verelst was Cornelis's father and thus Cornelis's life must fit the facts of Herman's life. Antoine Frédéric Harms (1742) decided that Simon was Cornelis's brother and teacher and was born in the Low Countries. (Note: Harms uses the form of name: Corneille Verelst.) Matthew Pilkington (1770) elaborated on Weyerman's statement that Cornelis was a good flower painter by adding that his subjects and colouring were similar to Simon's. Horace Walpole (usually the most reliable of sources) in 1762 only said of Cornelius that he was Herman's son. Jean-Baptiste Descamps (1753) added the place of death as London. (Note: Descamps uses the form of name: Cornille Verelst.) Michael Bryan (1816) synthesised these various additions to Weyerman's account into a brief entry:

Verelst, Cornelius. He was the son of Harman Verelst, born at Vienna in 1667, and accompanied his father to England, where he met with success in painting similar subjects.

Peter Hancox summarised the lack of archival evidence and the apparent lack of consistency amongst the early biographers: “In the intervening eighty-seven years [from Weyerman to Bryan], Cornelius has changed parents, acquired a date and place of birth, travelled to England and painted the same subjects as Herman rather than Simon. ... Placed side-by-side, the inescapable impression is that no one after Weyerman knew anything about Cornelius.”

== Identification of Cornelis Verelst ==
Given that there was no person of the name “Cornelis Verelst” but that Weyerman's biography seems to refer to a unique person, there are three members of the Verelst family who may be the real subject of Weyerman's text.

John Verelst (1648-1679) is the least likely candidate. He painted flower pieces and was Simon Verelst's brother. Weyerman had worked in London from 1704 to 1720. This John Verelst died twenty-five years before Weyerman was in London and had a limited reputation even in his lifetime.

William Verelst (1651-1702) is the most likely identification. In his day, he was a well-known and respected flower painter, almost the equal of his brother, Simon. Although Weyerman could not have met William, he may have heard of him through Simon Verelst or others.

John Verelst (c. 1670-1734) was a portraitist rather than a flower painter. He had a royal commission in 1710 and so it is likely that Weyerman would have heard of John, even if he had not met him.

In summary: William Verelst (1651–1702) is the most likely candidate to be identified with Cornelis Verelst. It is possible that Weyerman's biography is a partial conflation of the lives of both William Verelst (1651–1702) and John Verelst (c. 1670-1734).
