= John Cartier =

British colonial governor

John Cartier (23 May 1733 – 25 January 1802) was a British colonial governor in India. He served as Governor of Bengal from 1769 to 1772.

== Early career ==
Cartier first arrived in India as a writer in the service of the British East India Company. He was expelled from Dacca in 1756 while serving there as an assistant. After fleeing with other fugitives to Fulta, he joined Clive of India and helped in the retaking of Bengal, for which he was praised by the Court of Directors of the British East India Company. Cartier's career accelerated after the Battle of Plassey. In 1761, Cartier became chief of the Dacca factory. By 1767, he was Second in the Calcutta Council.

== Governor of Bengal ==
On 26 December 1769 Cartier succeeded Harry Verelst as Governor of Bengal. Cartier was governor at time of the Bengal famine of 1770, during which one-third of the populace died. Cartier was blamed for ignoring warnings about the impending disaster but was able to use a magazine of grain to feed fifteen thousand people every day for some months.

In response to the crisis, the Court of Directors sent a three-person commission to Bengal to assess the situation. En route, however, the ship carrying the three members foundered at sea. The Court of Directors did not send a replacement and recalled Cartier. Warren Hastings was selected as his replacement; he took office on 28 April 1772.

Cartier became a High Sheriff of Kent in 1789. Unusually the previous incumbent, James Bond, continued from the year before and Cartier served only for the latter part of the year.

Cartier died in Bedgbury, Kent on 25 January 1802 and was buried at Goudhurst, Kent. He was eulogized by Edmund Burke for his government of Bengal. His wife Stephana, the daughter of Stephen Law, survived him and also died in Bedgbury on 22 August 1825.

== Notes ==
| Preceded by Harry Verelst | Governor of Bengal; 1769–1772 | Succeeded by Warren Hastings |
