= Maria Verelst =

English painter

Portrait of a lady
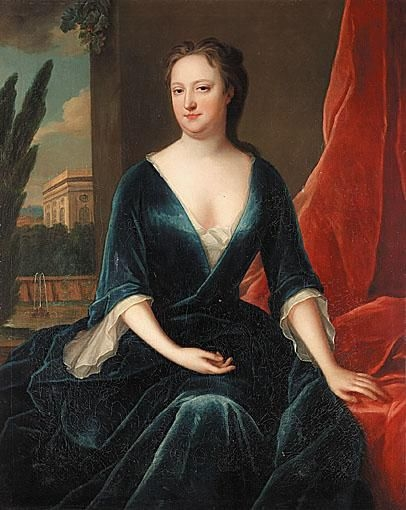
- Portrait of a lady, three-quarter length, seated
- Artist: Maria Verelst
- Year: c. 1725
- Medium: Oil on canvas
- Location: Sotheby's [auction house], The British Sale: Paintings & Watercolours, 2002, London
- Website: https://www.sothebys.com/en/auctions/ecatalogue/2002/the-british-sale-paintings-watercolours-l02155/lot.153.html

Maria Verelst (1680-1744) was supposedly an English artist born in Vienna and died in London after a career of portrait painting. This biography has been questioned with archival evidence supporting the view that “Maria Verelst” was Adriana Verelst (daughter of Herman Verelst), a fashionable portrait painter of the 1720s.

== Biography ==
There is no archival evidence for a "Maria Verelst", neither is there any contemporary documentary evidence for the life of a person named “Maria Verelst”.

The Christian name "Maria" first appeared in Matthew Bryan’s Dictionary of 1816. The earliest reference to an artistic daughter of Herman Verelst was made by Jacob Campo Weyerman in 1729. He refers to her as "Juffrow Verelst" ("Miss Verelst") and "N. Verelst"; he used "N." as an abbreviation where he did not know the name of an artist whether female or male. Authors writing between 1729 and 1816 refer to her as "Demoiselle Verelst", "N. Verelst", "Mlle Vérelst", "Madamoiselle Verelst" or Mademoiselle N. Verelst” It looks as if Bryan’s 1816 introduction of “Maria” was either poor compilation on his part (assuming that "M" was an abbreviation for Maria rather than "Mademoiselle") or a typesetting error.

The date of birth of 1680 (along with the place of birth being Antwerp) was first given by J.B. Descamps in 1753. No archival evidence for a birth or baptism in Antwerp has been found. Horace Walpole, writing in 1762, was the first to make the association with Herman Verelst as the father of this artist, previous biographers stating only that she was taught by her uncle. Later authors, knowing from Walpole and later biographies that Herman Verelst had fled from the siege of Vienna in 1683, reasoned that with a date of birth of 1680, Maria Verelst must have been born in Vienna.

Weyerman (1729) stated that he did not know if this artist were still living but hoped she was ("Wy hebben van haar dood niets gehoort, en verhoopen dat zy noch woont onder levenden"). Descamps (1753) thought that she had died in London but gave no date. Stefano Ticozzi (1818) claimed her date of death was believed to be in 1750 in London ("Si crede morta in quella capitale verso il 1750"). The first reference to 1744 as the date of death seems to occur as late as 1859 in Mrs. Ellet’s Women artists in all ages and countries. Later biographies do not give a source for this date.

Weyerman gave an account of a visit to a Drury Lane theatre with her aunt. Maria overheard some German nobles commenting on her beauty and upbraided them for discussing her in her hearing. The men excused themselves and later continued, speaking in Italian. She again admonished them. Later they continued in Latin. Maria complained that women’s opportunities were limited and that she shouldn’t be barred from using her linguistic abilities. The nobles were so impressed they inquired of her occupation and, on finding that she was a painter, visited her the following day bearing gifts and to have their portraits made. Weyerman also recorded her exceptional ability in playing several musical instruments.

== Identification with Adriana Verelst ==
There is no archival evidence for a "Maria Verelst", neither is there any contemporary documentary evidence for the life of a “Maria Verelst”. There is a relative abundance of contemporary evidence for Herman Verelst's daughter, Adriana Verelst (c. 1683-1769). There is contemporary evidence for birth, marriage, career (including signed receipts) and death but she is not included in later art histories. It has been argued that "Maria Verelst" is a misnaming of Adriana Verelst caused by later art dictionary editors expanding abbreviated forms of her name given by authors from Weyerman onwards ("N Verelst", "Mlle Verelst", "M. Verelst") into a fuller form of the name and then elaborating a biography reliant on uncertain evidence.

== Artistic career ==
Weyerman did not comment on Maria’s artistic training. Antoine Frédéric Harms (1742) explicitly stated that she was a disciple of her uncle Simon. John Hayes described Maria Verelst’s earliest works as being in the Kneller baroque tradition. By the 1720s, she was working in the manner of William Aikman and Charles Jervas. In the 1730s her style was closer to that of Thomas Hudson. Hayes wrote "her designs and poses are conventional; her modeling is firm, but her handling of drapery is somewhat primitive."

It has been suggested that Maria also worked with Sir James Thornhill at Northaw Place between 1728–32. Murals have been preserved in England that have been attributed as a joint effort between the two painters.

== Attributed artistic works ==
- Anne Blackett, Mrs John Trenchard afterwards Mrs Thomas Gordon, c. 1723 (Wikimedia)
- Duke of Chandos in the dressing room
- Marriage portrait of Penelope Smith holding a lamb, c. 1727 (Wikimedia)
- Nature morte aux huitres et aux crabs
- ‘’’Grisell Baillie, later Lady Murray’’’, 1725, Mellerstain House. (Wikimedia)
- Portrait of Duchess of Marlboro with Lady Diana Spencer, c. 1722 (Wikimedia)
- Portrait of Duke of Marlborough
- Portrait of Henrietta, Lady Luxborough, Lydiard Park, Swindon (Wikimedia)
- Portrait of a lady, half-length, in a silver white gown
- Portrait of a lady in a yellow dress seated, with a wooded landscape beyond
- Portrait of a Lady with a Country Estate in the Distance
- Portrait of a woman, Lady Middleton
- Portrait of Elizabeth Johnson, wife of Samuel Johnson, c. 1735 (Wikimedia)
- Portrait of Jane Stebbing, wife of Thomas Aynscombe, 1706 (possibly painted by John Verelst) (Wikimedia)
- Portrait of Lady Smythe, three-quarter-length
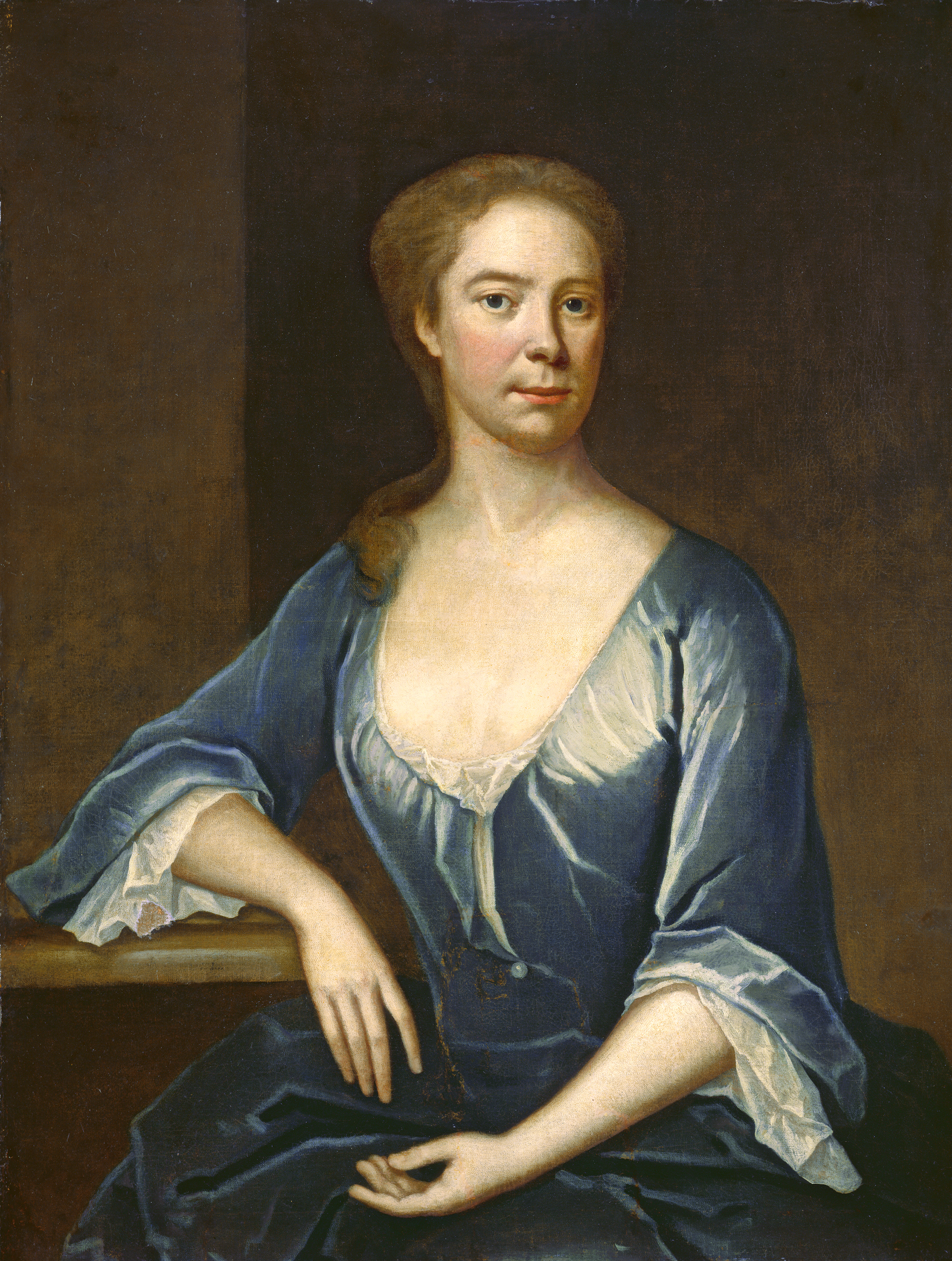
Portrait of a Lady, c. 1725

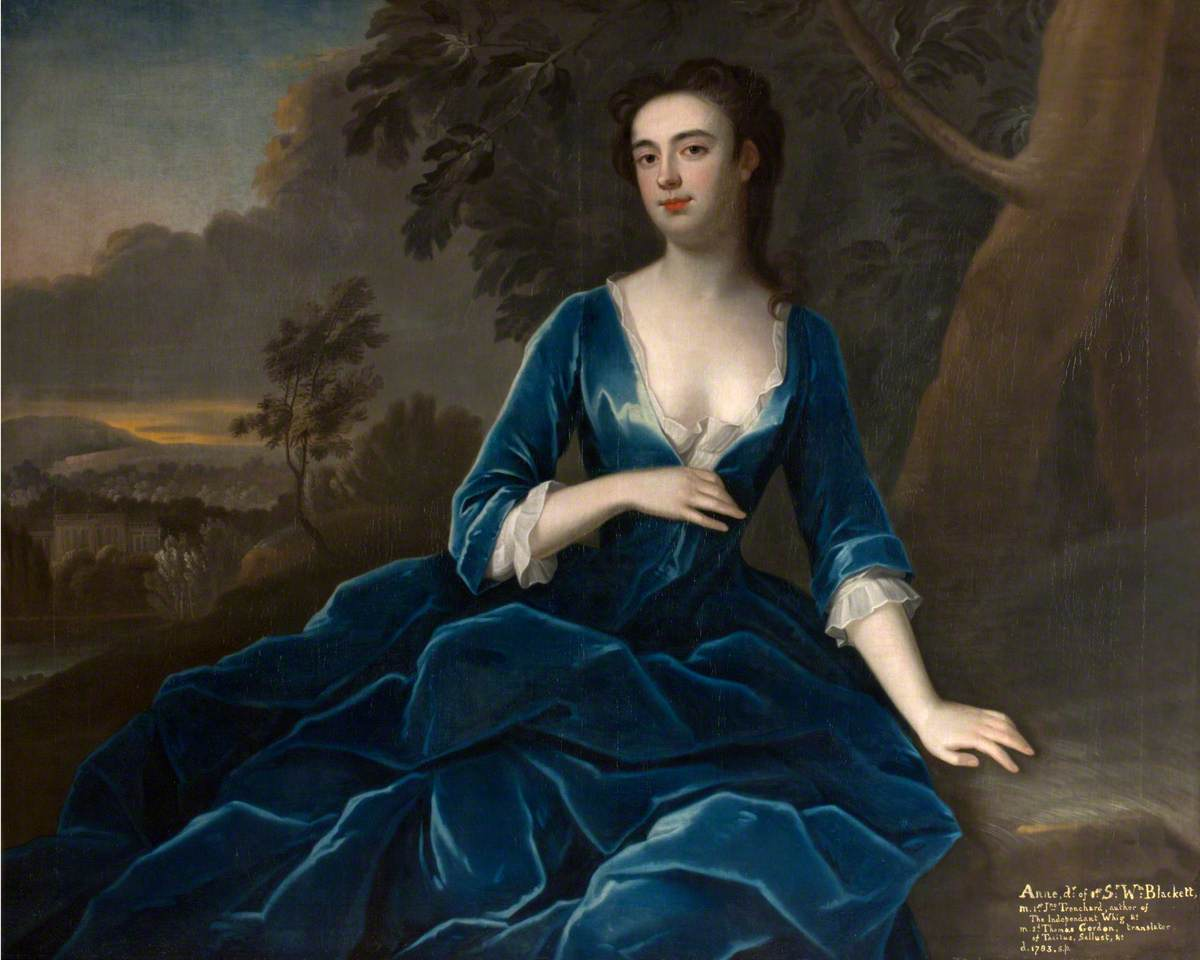
Anne Blackett, Mrs John Trenchard afterwards Mrs Thomas Gordon, c. 1723

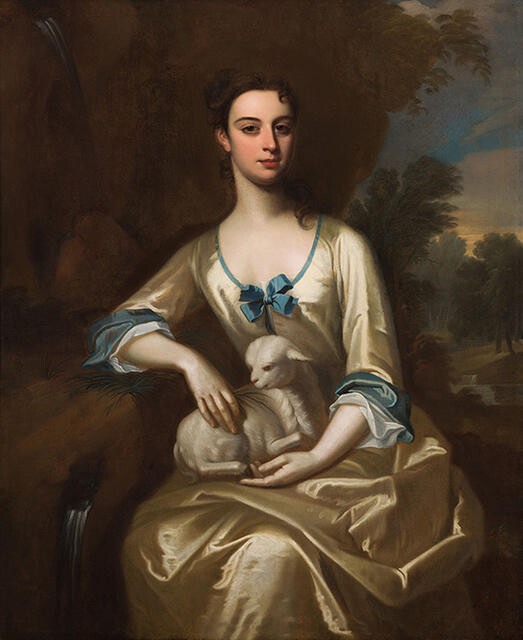
Marriage portrait of Penelope Smith holding a lamb, c. 1727

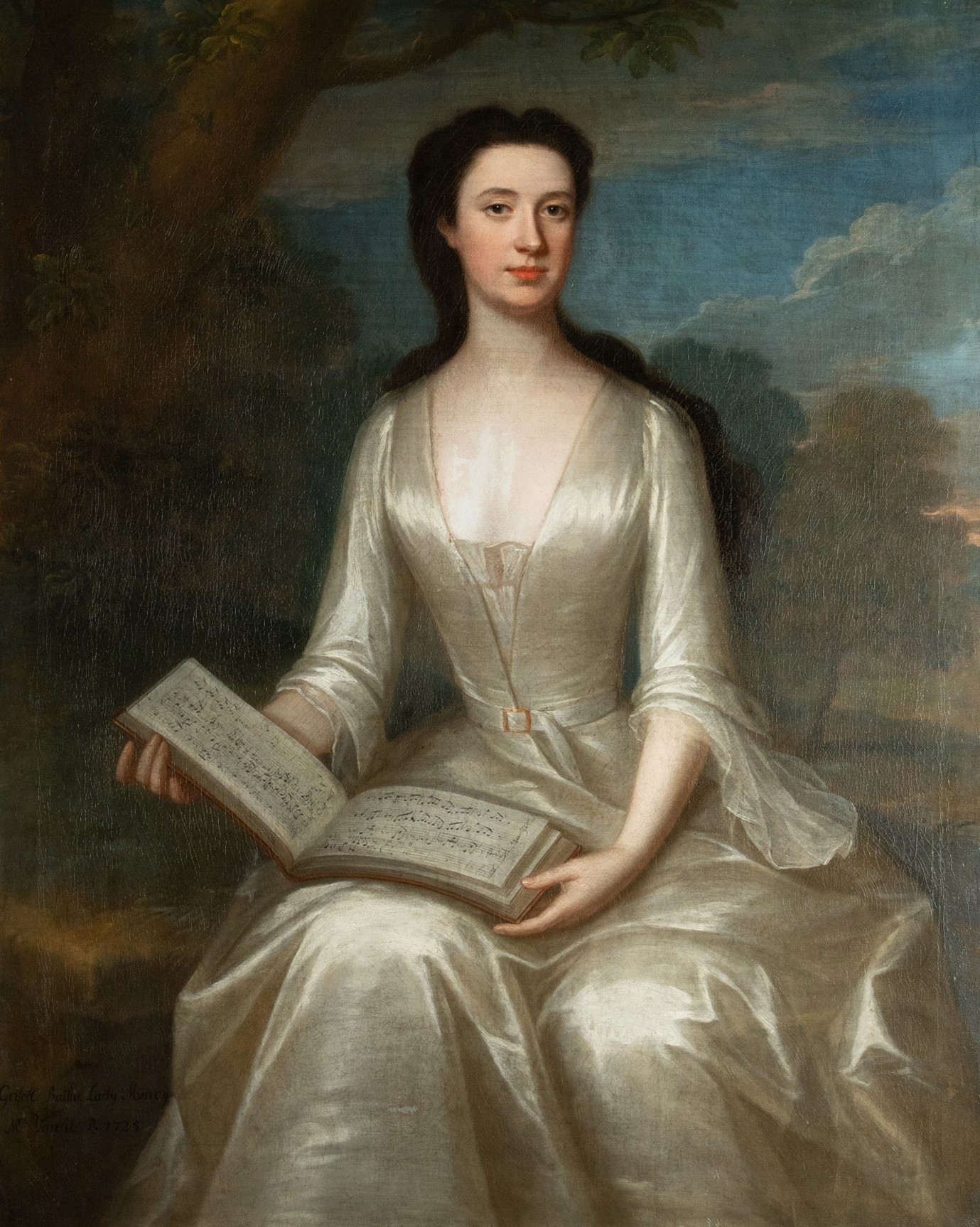
Portrait at Mellerstain of Grisell, Lady Murray, 1725

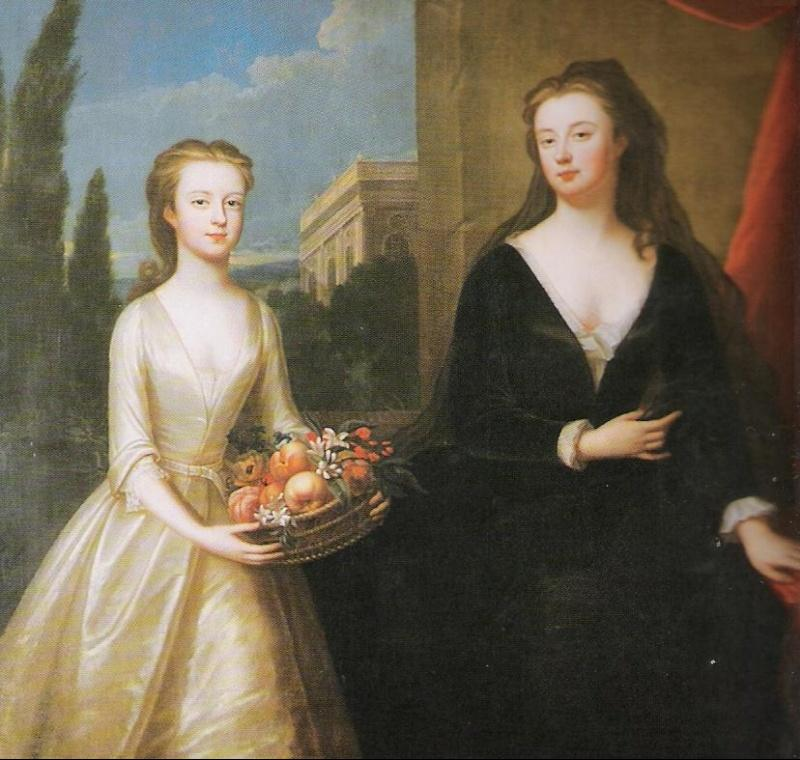
Portrait of Duchess of Marlboro with Lady Diana Spencer, c. 1722

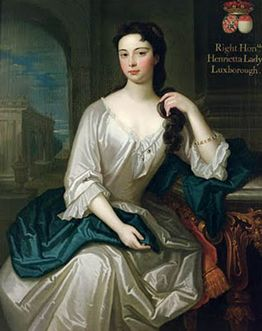
Portrait of Henrietta, Lady Luxborough

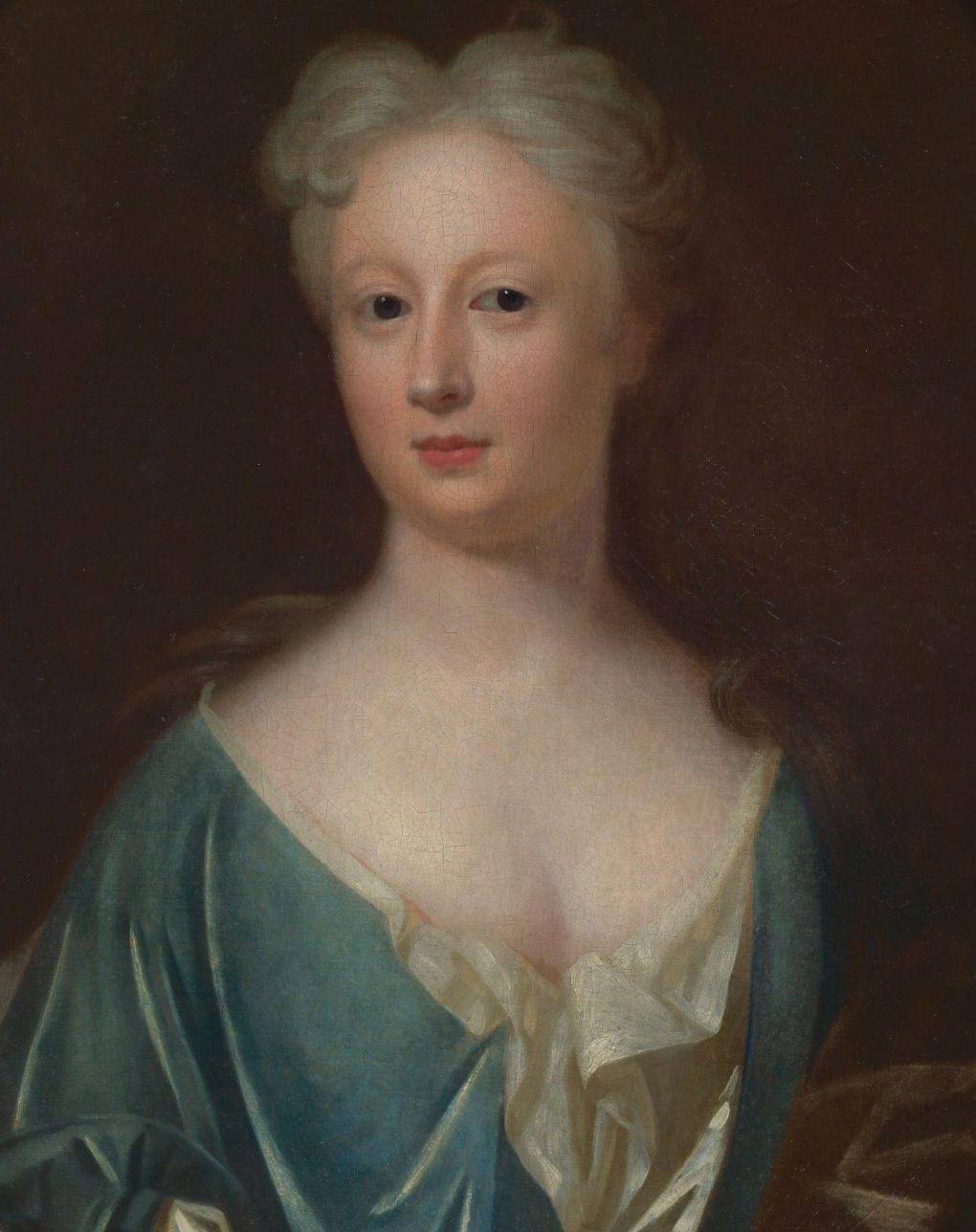
Portrait of Elizabeth Johnson, wife of Samuel Johnson, c. 1735

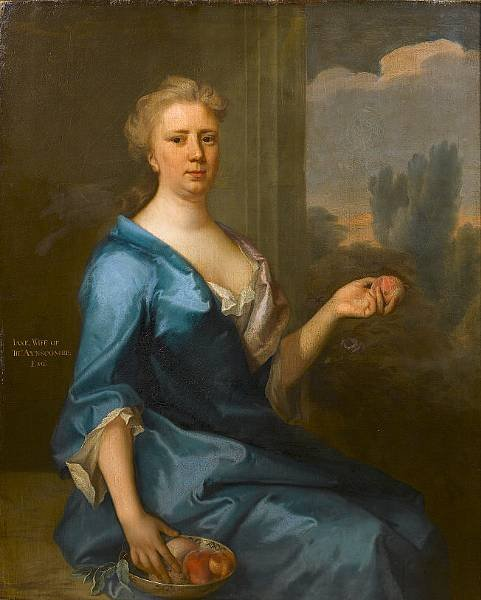
Portrait of Jane Stebbing, wife of Thomas Aynscombe, 1706
