= Fulta =

Fulta Phulta
- village
- Location in Odisha, India
- Coordinates: 19°16′29″N 84°48′43″E
- Country: India
- State: Odisha
- District: Ganjam

Languages
  - Official: Odia
- Time zone: UTC+5:30 (IST)
- PIN: 760003
- Telephone code: 0680
- Vehicle registration: OR-
- Nearest city: Berhampur
- Website: odisha.gov.in

Phulta is a village in Ganjam, Odisha, India. It is several kilometers away from the city of Berhampur.
