= Thomas Aynscombe =

Thomas Aynscombe was an early-18th-century Dunstable and Smithfield, London landlord and minor benefactor.

Thomas Aynscombe (died October 1740) of Charterhouse yard, and Northall in Buckinghamshire, was the son of Henry Aynscombe (died 1697), of St. Mary Woolnoth (where he was buried, in the chancel), citizen and haberdasher of London, by his wife Elizabeth (died 1711), daughter of Thomas Chew, Dunstable haberdasher, who had married Elizabeth, daughter of William Marsh of Dunstable in 1639.

His mother, Elizabeth Chew (a.k.a. Mrs. Henry Aynscombe), was one of the three sisters and coheirs of William Chew (another brother Thomas Chew, of Dunstable, (died 20 July 1698, aged 52 (Neve)), distiller, of Dunstable, who died unmarried and intestate 18 March 1712/13, aged 58, leaving an estate worth £28,000, this included property in St. John Street, Smithfield, and several coaching inns in Dunstable, the Windmill and Still (theirs since the 17th century [V.C.H.]), and the Sugar Loaf (acquired by 1713), one of the most famous coaching inns of the 18th century. It also included 14 farms in Dunstable, Luton, Kensworth, Caddington, Gravenhurst and Edlesborough, the manors (in Bedfordshire) of Fitzhugh, Edlesborough, Bowells and Northall (Buckinghamshire), the two inns (and the Maypole and Black Lion) and several other cottages and pieces of land in Dunstable, a house in London, and houses in the parish of St Sepulchre-without-Newgate, leased to London tradesmen. William Chew had been sheriff of Bedfordshire in 1709 and in 1703 had obtained a grant of arms with a device of Catherine wheels and griffins' heads, this was later to be the badge of the Foundation scholars. He was buried, like his nephew Thomas Chew Cart (died 1722) and sisters Frances Ashton (died 1727), Jane Cart (died 1736) and Elizabeth Aynscombe (died 1711) (all have monumental inscriptions), in Dunstable Priory. He is in the north aisle where Thomas Green of Camberwell did his monument.

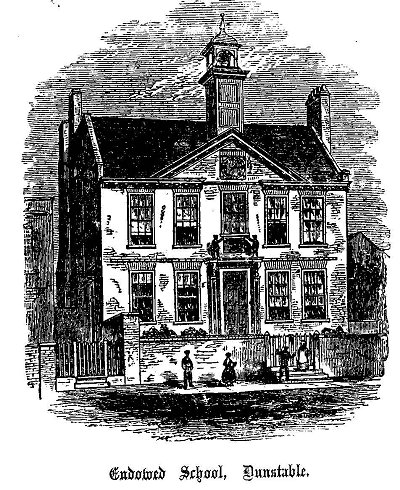
Chew's House, from Charles Lambourn's Dunstaplelogia, 1859

William Chew's estate was inherited by his sisters Frances (died 1727), who had married William Ashton, a London distiller, and Jane (died 1736) who had married James Cart (died 1706), citizen and distiller of London, and their nephew, Thomas Aynscombe in lieu of his mother, Elizabeth, who had died in 1711. These last three then created Chew's Foundation in Dunstable, which opened in September 1724. The school house still stands and records their names on its front.

== Wife and father-in-law ==
Aynscombe's first wife Jane, whom he married in 1706 in Norwich, was daughter of (major) Philip Stebbing (c. 1641 – 1705), grocer and Freeman of Norwich, and Deputy Lieutenant (D.L.) for the City and County of Norwich from 1701. He was apprenticed to the successful grocer and sometime MP for Norwich, Augustin Briggs, Esq. (senior), (c. 1618 – 1684), 3 August 1674. Was constable for the St. Peter Mancroft ward of Norwich in 1674; a Royalist (Tory) councillor (councilman) for the same ward, 1676–1682; chamberlain's council 1679–1681; alderman for the Berstreet ward, 1683–1688; alderman for the North Conisford ward, November 1688 – 1706; sheriff of Norwich 1682; and Mayor of Norwich 1687. As sheriffs he and Lawrence Goodwin had 'established a well-deserved reputation as merciless persecutors of non-conformists with a special animus for Quakers' (Evans p. 297). In February 1696 he was forced publicly to deny that on reading a 'printed paper' about the Jacobite plot to assassinate King William III he had gone to the Half Moon Coffee-house and declared that: 'the plott is mine Arse all over', (Norfolk Record Office, Mayor's Court books, vol. 26 f.10, via Mark Knights, 2005, page 158). He is buried in St Peter Mancroft, by the side of his wife, Anne Andrews (died 1702), and three children. One son was Georgius Stebbing, grocer, freeman, Norwich 24 March 1704, while another Philip Stebbing of Norwich, then of Sprowston, with property in Wymondham, died 1715 (also buried in St. Peter Mancroft) making his brother-in-law Thomas Aynscombe his heir; leaving him his messuages, lands, tenements, premises and hereditaments there (will dated 21 April 1715).

Jane Stebbing (Studio of John Verelst)

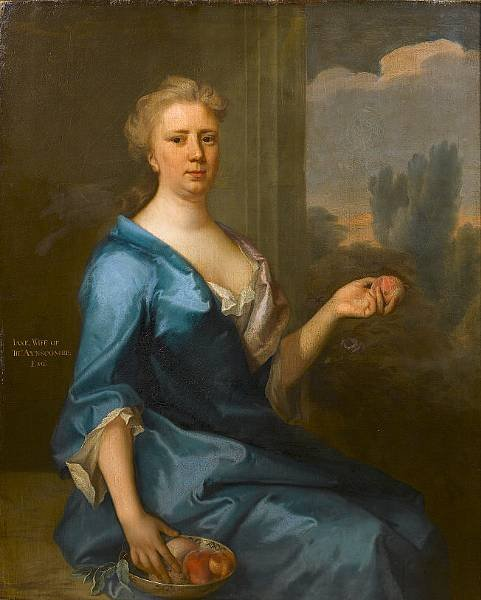
Jane Stebbing, wife to Thomas Aynscombe, painted c1706 by

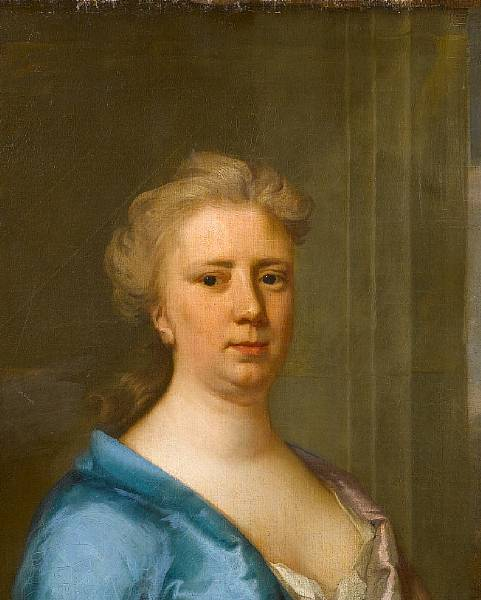
Detail of a portrait of Jane Aynscombe, c1705

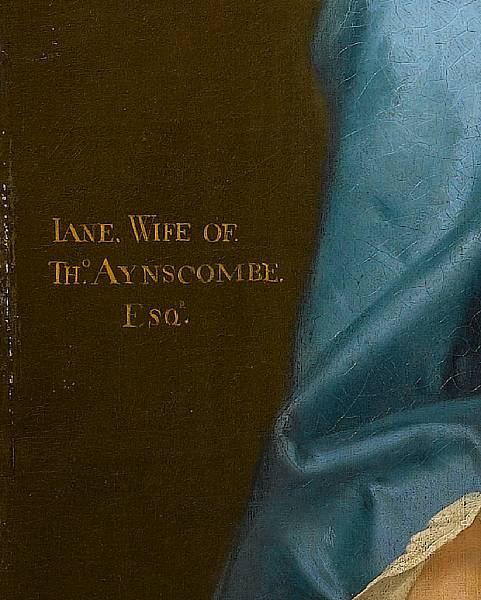
Inscription of a portrait of Aynscombe's wife, Jane

== Sister ==
Aynscombe's sister Jane Elliott (died 1718) also of Charterhouse yard, left him the interest on £3,000; £100 to Christ's Hospital, and £10 to charity schools in the Cities of London or Westminster. She asked to be buried in the chancell of the church in Lombard street as near my dear father as possible, but as her brother's will of 1739 suggests she was buried instead in St. Sepulchre. His other sister Elizabeth Gilbert (Christened 30 February 1674-still alive in 1739) had a son Thomas Chew Gilbert (died June 1739, buried Paddington).

== Will ==
Aynscombe desired to be buried in the parish of St Sepulchre: as near the grave of my late dear wife and children and my affectionate sister Mrs Jane Elliott [died 1718] as conveniently may be willing and desiring that a sum not exceeding one hundred guineas be laid out in a handsome monument there to be erected for me and that the further sum of two hundred pounds be laid out upon my funeral which I desire may be from Hicks Hall in St John Street out of which sum I desire all my tenants that pay me rent to the value of ten pounds a year may have a flowered ring of the respective value of twelve shillings... Aynscombe was governor and benefactor of several hospitals, so claimed the Gentleman's Magazine. He left £200 each to Christ's Hospital and to St. Bart's. hospital, and £20 to the charity school of St. Sepulchre. He is buried at St Sepulchre-without-Newgate. (Sir) John Bosworth, (Esq.), (died 1749), tobacconist of Newgate street, Chamberlain of the City of London, master Edward Dod, late of Cornhill, now of Austin Friars, linen draper, and John Miller, senior, of Dunstable, wholesale dealer in straw and oatts [sic], were the trustees.

== Descendants ==
Six generation ancestral table connecting families of Aynscombe, Smith, Challoner, Wight, Townsend, Bisse, de Salis, inter alia.

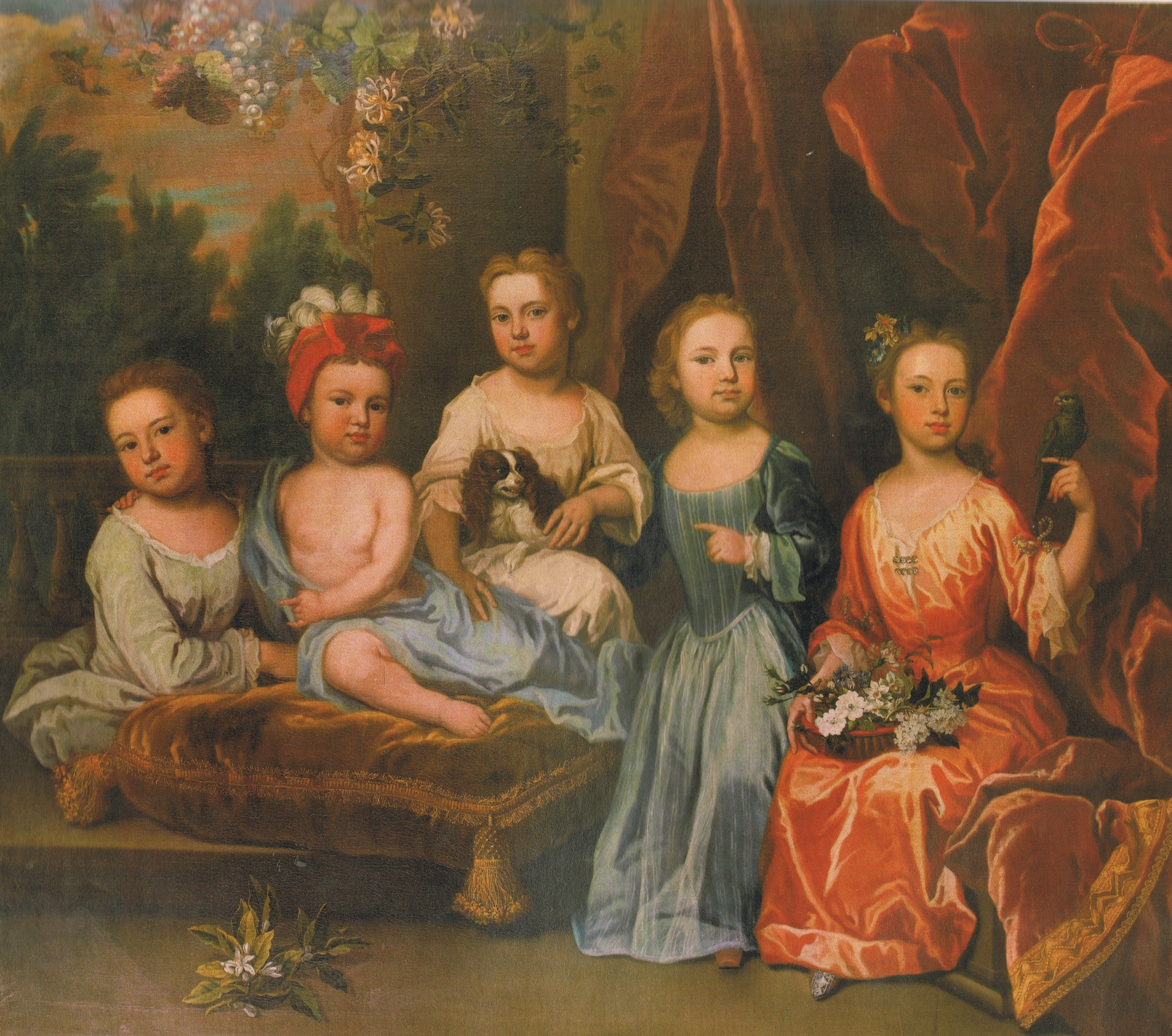
The five eldest (right to left) children of Robert Smith (died 1748), as depicted by James Maubert (1666–1746). Oil on canvas, 62 by 69 inches. Aynscombe's son-in-law, Lillie Smith, is wearing the feathered headress.

All his sons Philip, Thomas and Chew pre-deceased him. Philip (died 1737, aged c. 30) was admitted a gentleman commoner 24 December 1724 and matriculated at Trinity College, Cambridge in 1725, and had was given his MA in 1728, having been admitted to Lincoln's Inn on 4 February 1725/26. He married Valentina Wight, of St. George, Hanover Square (died 1745), the granddaughter of Daniel Wight the younger (died 1705), of Southwark, distiller, and owner of, amongst other things in Holborn and Borough, The George Inn, Southwark.

A marriage settlement (Q/EV/116) dated 3 January 1706/07, shows the extent of some property that remained with the Aynscombe family into the 1840s.

Contents:

1. Daniel Wight [III], of Southwark, distiller, son and heir of Daniel Wight, citizen and distiller, of London, dec.
2. Thos. Malyn of Southwark, Brewer, & Valentina [Malyn], his eldest daughter; Saml. Wight, citizen and skinner, of London; & Edmond Halsey of Southwark, Brewer:

12 messuages in Johnsons Court [ Dr. Johnson lived at no. 7 Johnsons Court c. 1759–1776) ] alias Morecrofts Ct., Fleet St., St. Dunstan's in the West, purchased from Jn. & Wm. Morecroft; George Inn, St. Saviours, Southwark, purchased of Sir Jn. Sweetaple, Knt.; 3 messuages in Compter [Counter] Lane, St. Saviours [west-side of Borough], purchased of Susan Morell & her son, Richard M.

Philip Aynscombe died at Boulogne in 1737, probably in debt, subsequently Thomas Aynscombe became entrusted with his son's property (see above) and spent the end of his life defending this, his granddaughter's, Valentina's, inheritance (£12,000) in the courts; see Frederick v Aynscombe (1738–39).

Smith's Name Act 1746
- Act of Parliament
- Parliament of Great Britain
- Long title: An Act to enable Lillie Smith and his Heirs by Valentina his Wife (formerly Valentina Aynscombe) to take and use the Surname of Aynscombe, pursuant to the Will of Thomas Aynscombe Esquire, deceased.
- Citation: 20 Geo. 2. c. 7 Pr.
- Territorial extent: Great Britain

Dates
- Royal assent: 24 March 1747
- Commencement: 18 November 1746 (Note: Start of session.)
Other legislation
Relates to	Aynscombe's Estate Act 1757

Status: Current legislation

Aynscombe's Estate Act 1757
- Act of Parliament
- Parliament of Great Britain
- Long title: An Act for vesting the settled Estates of Lillie Smith Aynscombe Esquire and Valentina his Wife in Trustees, to be sold; and for applying the Money arising by such Sale in the Purchase of other Freehold Lands, Tenements, and Hereditaments, to be settled and limited to the like Uses; and for other Purposes in the said Act mentioned.
- Citation: 30 Geo. 2. c. 49 Pr.
- Territorial extent: Great Britain

Dates
- Royal assent: 17 May 1757
- Commencement: 2 December 1756
Other legislation
Relates to	Smith's Name Act 1746

Status: Current legislation

Aynscombe's only granddaughter, heir-at-law and devisee, Valentina (died 3 April 1771, near Windsor), the only child of his only surviving son Philip, married Lillie Smith (c. 1715 – 10 February 1791, buried Clewer). As demanded by the will of Thomas Aynscombe, by private act of Parliament in 1747, Smith's Name Act 1746, (20 Geo. 2. c. 7 Pr.), Lillie Smith changed his surname to Aynscombe, or as the House of Lords Journal, of 9 February 1747, called it: 'Smith's Bill to take name of Aynscombe'. In 1757 he used another private act of Parliament, Aynscombe's Estate Act 1757 (30 Geo. 2. c. 49 Pr.), to re-settle his father-in-law's property. Lillie was the elder son of Robert Smith (c. 1672 – Mortlake 11 January 1748), a freeman of London and eminent merchant, of Thames Street, of the parish of St James Garlickhythe, Worcester Place (near Kennet wharf), of Mortlake, and Coldashby in Northamptonshire.

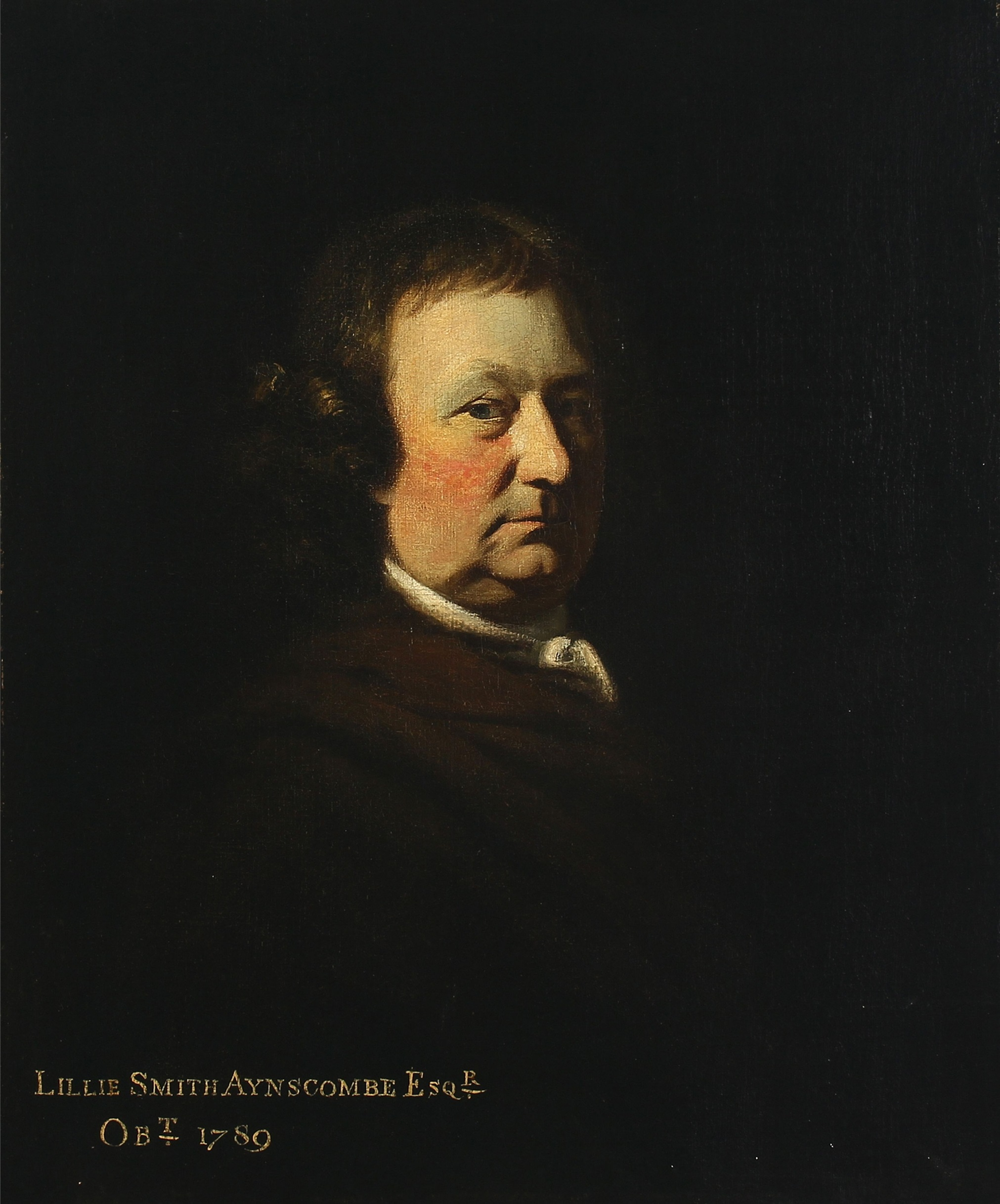
29 x 24.5 inch oil on canvas portrait of Lillie Smith Aynscombe (c1715-1791), director of the Sun Fire Office, by Reynolds.

Robert Smith had given Lillie £10,000 and moiety or half part of my trade on his marriage to Valentina in c. 1746; and then left him in his will 50 shares in the Sun Fire Office. Smith had acquired his share of the Sun Fire Office on 24 August 1720 (Dickson, page 271).

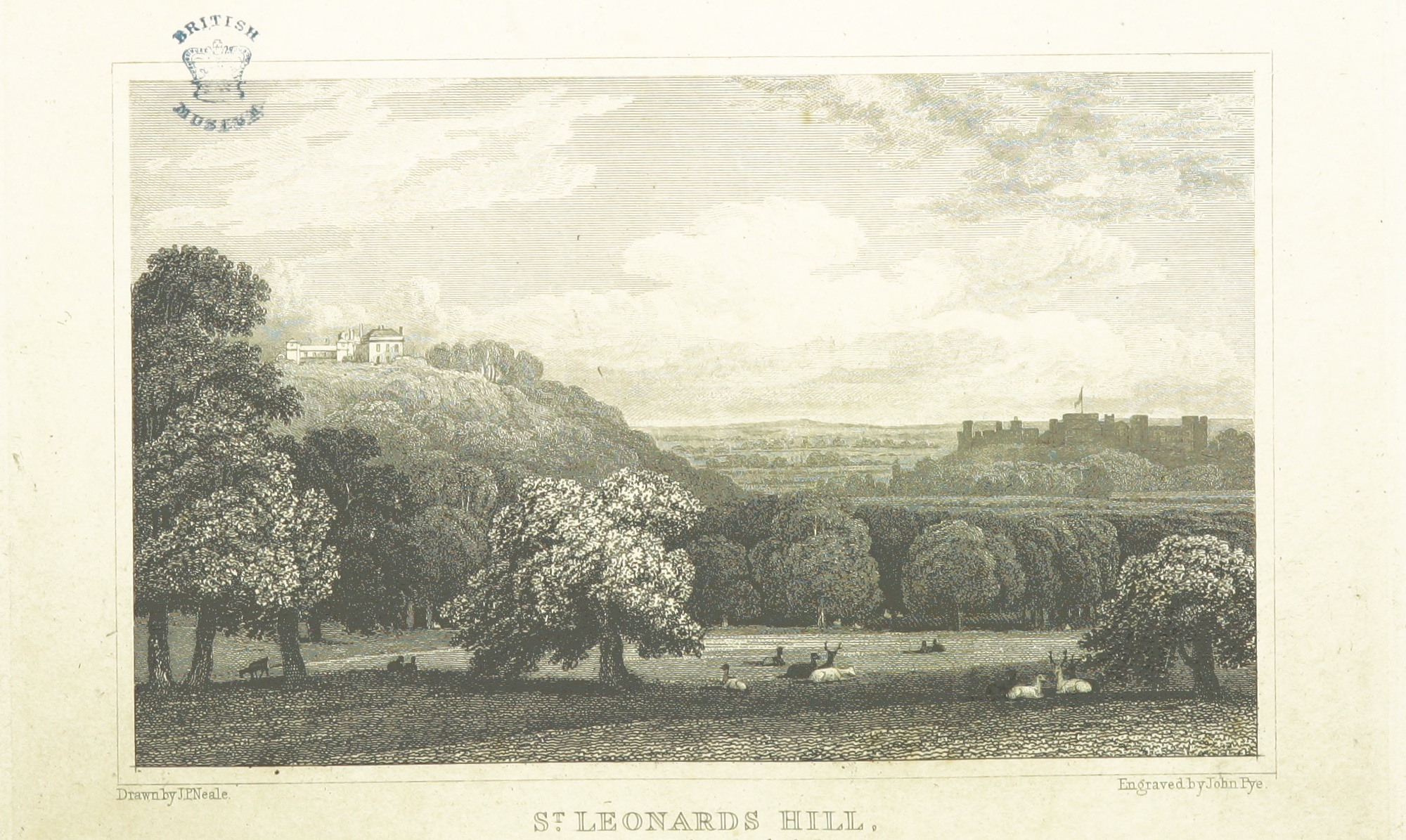
A distant prospect of the post-1773 St. Leonard's Hill. From Jones's Views of Seats, 1829

Lillie Smith Aynscombe was a director of the Sun Fire Office from, at latest, 1754 until his death in 1791. Around 1750 he bought and rebuilt the Hermitage, St. Leonard's Hill, Clewer, Windsor, and lived there to 1773 when he sold it to the Duke of Gloucester who renamed it Sophia Farm. The site formed part of the Windsor Safari Park and today is within Legoland. When Lillie Aynscombe died in 1791 The Scots Magazine, reported it thus:

10. At his seat at Mortlake, Lillie Ainscombe, Esq; one of the directors of the Sun Fire assurance-office. He has left seven sisters, whose ages, computed with his own, some little time before his death, made 572 years.

— The Scots Magazine, (vol. 53, p. 102)

He also left three daughters (all died sine prole (d.s.p.)):

- Valentina Aynscombe (c. 1749 – 23 March 1841 (GM 556), aged 92), of Cromwell house, Mortlake. On death the Gentleman's Magazine described her as "the only remaining daughter of the late Lillie Smith Aynscombe of St. Leonard's Hill, Berks". In 1828 she donated £100 towards the establishment of King's College, London. (Old) Cromwell House was demolished in 1857, though the gate piers remain (down Aynscombe Lane). The Bristol benefactor and slave-dealer Edward Colston had died there in 1721.
- Mary Aynscombe (died 1828) married the Rev. John Mossop (1774–1849), vicar of Hothfield in Kent from 1802 to 1849. Mossop remarried, 1 August 1843, and had two children: John Henry Mossop and Mary Aynscombe Mossop. (John Henry Mossop was Captain of Boats (rowing) at Eton in 1865, and was in the Oppidan Wall and Field XIs of 1864. After Christ Church, Oxford he lived at 50 Charles street, Berkeley Square).

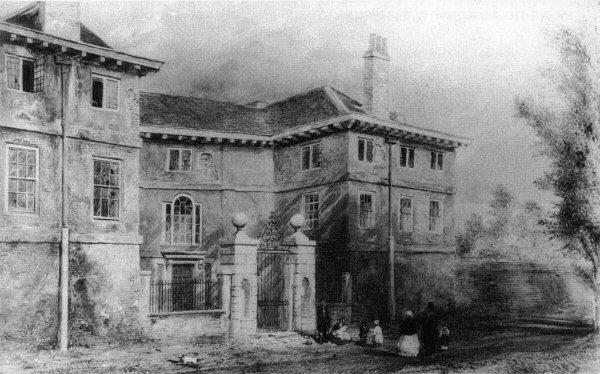
Cromwell House, Mortlake. The Aynscombe family home down to 1841

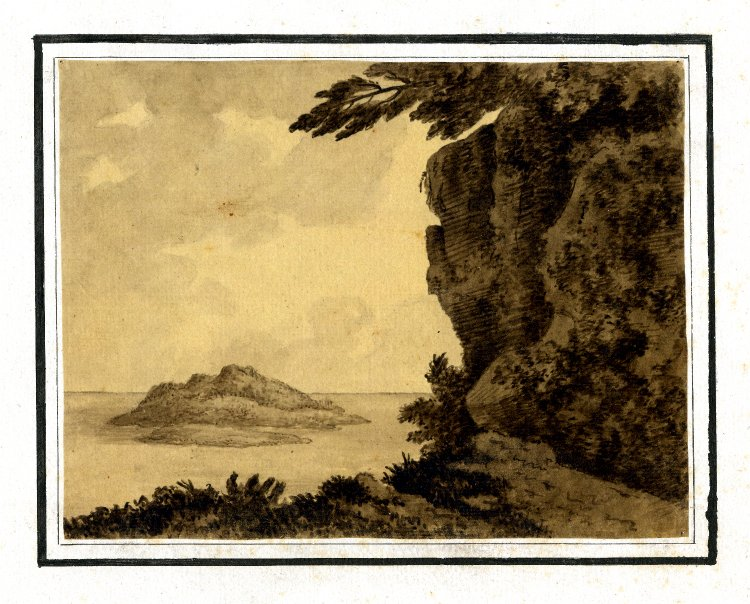
Charlotte Aynscombe and Alexander Cozens Landskip, circa 1750s, now in the British Museum.

- Charlotte Anne Aynscombe, (1760 at Clewer - died 1799, Mortlake), there is a tablet in the vestry of the church in Mortlake. Drawing maestro Alexander Cozens is thought to have taught her (see Kim Sloan), and probably both her siblings, and certainly their first cousin, Henry Stebbing (1752–1818). They acquired in 1794 an album of Cozens' which contained amongst the 121 etchings, prints and drawings, work by Alexander Cozens, John Robert Cozens, and possibly their own copies of Cozens' work (Christie's, June 1982 and July 1991, and see Kim Sloan).

A great-nephew of Thomas Aynscombe's grandson-in-law Lillie Smith Aynscombe, Thomas-Chaloner Bisse-Challoner (1788-1872), of Portnall Park, Virginia Water, was his family's eventual heir.

== Photos ==
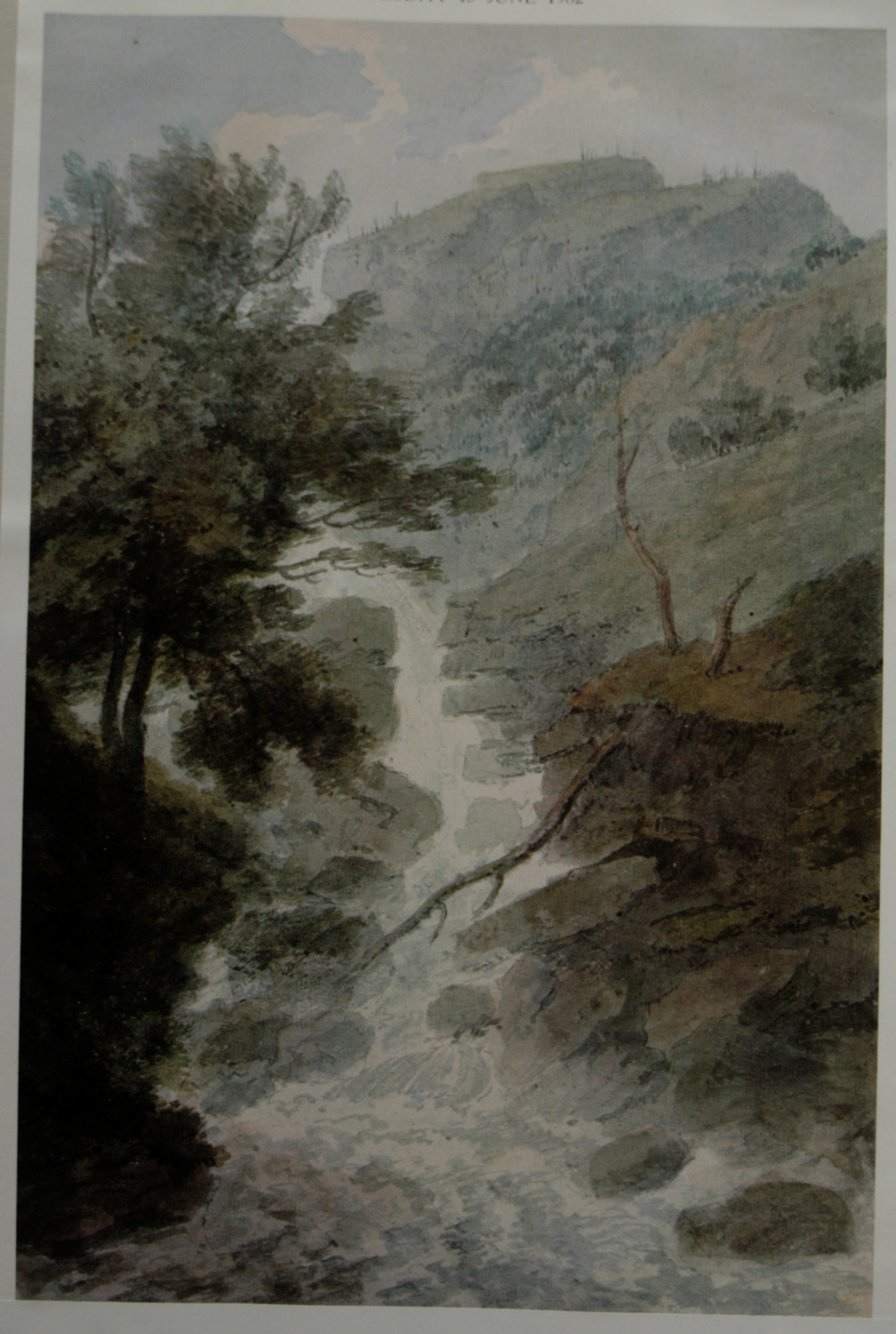
The Falls of Reichenbach, pencil and watercolour, by John Robert Cozens (1752-97), from Miss Aynscombe's album.
