= Michael Verelst =

English portrait painter (1675 – 1752)

- Born: c. 1675; Venice
- Died: buried 30 June 1752 (aged about 77); King’s Lynn
- Resting place: St Margaret’s, King’s Lynn
- Spouse: Mary Bennett
- Parents: Herman Verelst (father); Cecilia Verelst (née Fend) (mother)
- Relatives: Pieter Verelst (grandfather); Simon Verelst (uncle); John Verelst (1648-1679) (uncle); William Verelst (1651–1702) (uncle); Lodvick Verelst (brother); John Verelst (c. 1670-1734) (brother); Adriana Verelst (sister); William Verelst (1704-1752) (nephew); Harry Verelst (colonial governor) (great nephew)

Michael Verelst (born c. 1675, probably in Venice) was the fourth surviving child of Herman Verelst and Cecilia Fend, originally from Venice. Herman was an established portrait painter in Amsterdam but, with the collapse of the art market in the Low Countries in the late 1660s onwards, moved his family through Europe, starting in Venice and, in 1683, escaping the siege of Vienna to flee to London. Michael was born in Venice. Michael presumably was Herman's pupil.

A licence was issued for the marriage of Michael Verelst and Sarah Laverne on 5 April 1697 but there is no evidence that marriage was conducted. Michael Verelst married Mary Bennett of Queniborough, Leicestershire in 1699 or early 1700. They lived in Nottingham having seven children of whom only one lived to adulthood.

Michael Verelst's wife, Mary, probably died in 1740. He was buried at St Margaret's, King’s Lynn on 30 June 1752.

== Artistic career ==
The only direct evidence of Michael Verelst as an artist comes from records of property transactions which have survived with the second describing him as a "limner". No surviving works have been identified. He was sufficiently wealthy to be able to receive £100 of shares in the Royal African Company from Anthony Vial of Winchester Street, London, on 15 June 1721. (Note: No record of the source of Verelst's wealth has survived. He may have inherited from his father, Herman Verelst: there is a reference to his sister, Adriana Verelst, inheriting from Herman Verelst but it is short of detail. Any wills made by Michael Verelst's mother, father-in-law and mother-in-law (if made) have not been traced.)
