= Lodvick Verelst =

English portrait painter (1668 – 1704)

- Born: Amsterdam
- Baptised: 21 October 1668
- Died: October 28, 1704 (aged 36); Wollaston Hall, Wollaston, Stourbridge
- Resting place: St Mary’s church, Oldswinford, Stourbridge
- Monuments: St Mary’s church, Oldswinford, Stourbridge
- Other names: Lodewijck Verelst, Lodovick Verelst, Lodwick Verelst
- Occupation: portrait painter.
- Spouse: Elizabeth Adams (née Field)
- Parents: Herman Verelst (father); Cecilia Verelst (née Fend) (mother)
- Relatives: Pieter Verelst (grandfather); Simon Verelst (uncle); John Verelst (1648-1679) (uncle); William Verelst (1651–1702) (uncle); John Verelst (c. 1670-1734) (brother); Michael Verelst (brother); Adriana Verelst (sister); William Verelst (1704-1752) (nephew); Harry Verelst (colonial governor) (great nephew)

Lodvick Verelst (1668, Amsterdam – 1704, Wollaston, Stourbridge) was an English portrait painter.

== Biography ==
Lodvick (Lodewijck, Lodovick, Lodwick) Verelst (baptised 21 October 1668, Amsterdam) was the eldest child of Herman Verelst (a portrait painter) and Cecilia Fend, originally from Venice. With the collapse of the art market in the Low Countries in the late 1660s onwards, Lodvick moved with his family to Venice, then to Ljubljana and then to Vienna, where they fled from the Turkish siege of 1683 to London. Herman became an established portrait painter in London and Lodvick seems to have been his pupil.

On 30 July 1695, Lodvick Verelst married Elizabeth Adams (née Field). Elizabeth brought wealth from her inheritance from her first husband, Charles Adams (died 1688) and probably a house in Hatton Garden.

Lodvick made his will on 12 September 1704, witnessed by members of the household of John Wheeler, a local iron master, living at Wollaston Hall, Stourbridge. He died on 28 October 1704 and was buried in the church yard of St Mary’s, Oldswinford. He is commemorated by a plaque within the church.

Lodvick Verelst’s will provides evidence of his siblings, bequeathing a gold guinea to each of Peter, John, Michael and Adriana, and to his mother. The sale of household goods and a "Collection of fine original Pictures" together with the sale or let of the Hatton Garden house was advertised in June 1705. Elizabeth returned to live near her family in Fulham, being buried there on 7 February 1712.

== Artistic career ==
The only direct evidence of Lodvick Verelst as an artist is in his will where he is described as a "limner". Portraits had been commissioned from members of the Verelst family by some families in Stourbridge, notably Joseph Ford (a local solicitor) who bequeathed pictures of his wife "drawn by Mr Verelst Junr …." and "drawn by Mr Verelst Seno." (It is impossible to decide exactly to which members of the Verelst family this refers.) No surviving works have been identified.
