= William Verelst =

English painter

- Born: 29 December 1704; London
- Died: Buried 20 October 1752 (age 48)
- Resting place: St Margaret Lothbury, London
- Education: Merchant Taylors' School
- Occupation: Portrait painter
- Notable work: Audience Given by the Trustees of Georgia to a Delegation of Creek Indians
- Parents: John Verelst (c. 1670–1734) (father); Anne Verelst (née Tureng) (mother)
- Relatives: Pieter Verelst (great grandfather); Herman Verelst (grandfather); Simon Verelst (great uncle); John Verelst (1648–1679) (great uncle); William Verelst (1651–1702) (great uncle); Lodvick Verelst (uncle); Michael Verelst (uncle); Adriana Verelst (aunt); Harry Verelst (colonial governor) (nephew)

William Verelst (1704–1752) was an English painter who specialised in portrait painting. He was the great nephew of William Verelst, a 17th-century Anglo-Dutch painter who specialised in flower paintings.

== Biography ==
William Verelst was the sixth child of John Verelst and Anne Verelst (née Tureng). He was born on 29 December 1704 and baptised on 17 January 1705 at St Martin-in-the-Fields. (Note: In early editions of the Dictionary of National Biography, William Verelst is erroneously named as "Willem". There is no archival or primary documentary evidence that William Verelst used the name "Willem" nor would this be expected of an English citizen. His father is given as "Cornelius Verelst". Again, there is no archival evidence of a person of that name although Weyerman gives "Kornelis Verelst" a biography as early as 1729 based on his recollections of his time in London in the 1710s. It has been argued that Weyerman was describing either John (1648-1679) or William (1651-1702).) He was the last of four generations of artists beginning with his great grandfather, Pieter Verelst; grandfather Herman Verelst; great uncles Simon Verelst, John Verelst (1648-1679), William Verelst (1651–1702); father John Verelst (c. 1670–1734); uncles Lodvick Verelst, Michael Verelst and aunt Adriana Verelst.

John and Anne's residence was at the Rainbow and Dove by Ivy Bridge in the Strand and William was educated at Merchant Taylors' school, then in nearby Suffolk Street, London.

William did not marry. He was buried on 20 October 1752 at St Christopher le Stocks which was demolished in 1782. The burials were removed by their relatives to the adjoining church of St Margaret Lothbury, or elsewhere.

== Artistic career ==
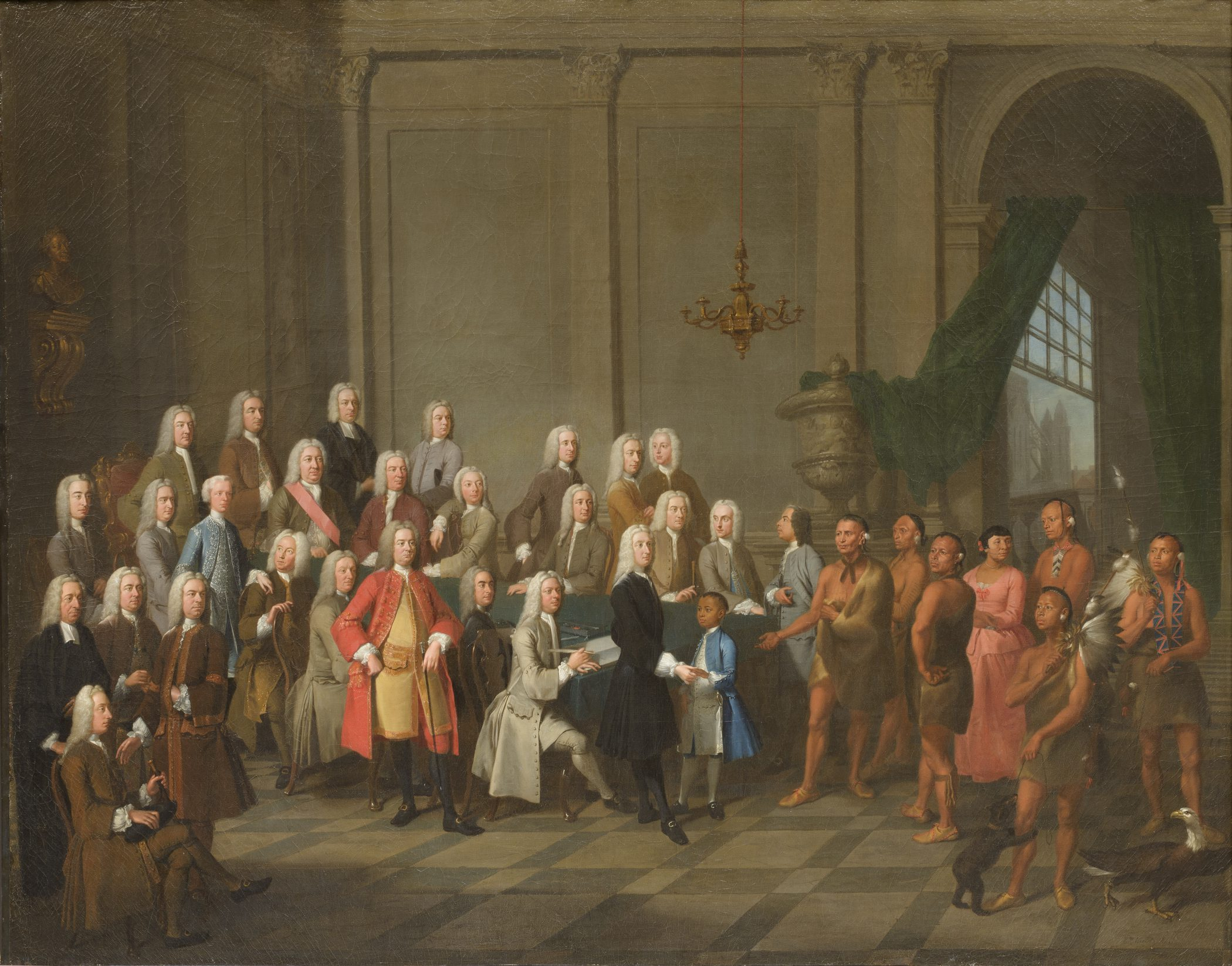
Audience Given by the Trustees of Georgia to a Delegation of Creek Indians (1734–1736)

Presumably William was trained in portraiture by his father, John Verelst, who had some success in the 1710s in particular as a court painter. John had painted the portraits of four Indigenous delegates (called "Indian kings" by the British) who visited London in 1710 with prints of these paintings being widely available. John's career faded and he was declared bankrupt in 1727. William was an executor of his father on his death in 1734 when William was twenty nine by which time he was an independent artist.

William's career owed much to his older brother, Herman Verelst (1694–1764). He was the secretary or accountant to a number of organizations including the Foundling Hospital and the Trustees for the Establishment of the Colony of Georgia in America. The Trustees brought some representatives of the Yamacraw tribe to London in 1734 to witness the signing of a treaty between the tribe and the Trustees. In a parallel with his father's career, William Verelst was commissioned to portray a meeting of the Trustees and the Yamacraw and a portrait of the leader, Tomo Chachi Mico and Tooanahowi his nephew. The latter was engraved and published by John Faber. (Note: The group portrait was probably begun in 1734 and took several years to complete. John Perceval, first Earl of Egmont, recorded sitting for Verelst three times between April 1735 and April 1736.)

William put some effort into developing his network of potential clients. In the early 1730s, he had joined the Masons with membership of two lodges and, in 1733, served as a steward for a year. He was a subscriber to a book by Martin Clare (died 1751), a fellow mason who was elected to the Royal Society in 1735. Verelst was able to use the prestige of the Georgia Trustees commission to obtain further commissions for instance with the Filmer family.

Beversham Filmer (1685 - 1763) was a fellow mason who cultivated Verelst's friendship after the success of the Georgia Trustees commission. Beversham and his brother, Sir Edward Filmer (3rd bart., 1683–1755), both commissioned portraits, the process being described in a series of letters between the two brothers and in one letter from William Verelst. (This gives his signature which is also used in the same form on contemporary paintings.) These portraits have not been identified and may not have survived. The letters give information about price, location of sittings, alterations to satisfy the client, varnishing, and transport and delivery. (Note: Seven letters from Beversham Filmer to Sir Edward Filmer are preserved in Kent County Archives together with one letter (25 December 1735) from William Verelst to Sir Edward. Maidstone, Kent, Kent History and Library Centre, 10-05-1735, U120/C26/10; 07-06-1735, U120/C26/11; 07-08-1735, U120/C26/15; 21-10-1735, U120/C26/17; 25-12-1735, U120/C44/1; 29-01-1736, U120/C26/20; 17-06-1740, U120/C27/5; 09-11-1751, U120/C29/25.)

There was one more high-profile commission. John Dean was a sailor on the Sussex, an East India Company ship which was wrecked off Madagascar in March 1738. The captain, Francis Gostling, survived the shipwreck. Returning to London, he gave an account which was initially accepted by the East India Company. Gostling was held responsible for the death of sixteen sailors (including Dean) but not responsible for the loss of the cargo. However, the Company received word in September 1740 that John Dean had survived (having reached land, walked across Madagascar where he was able to find a ship to return him to Bombay). Dean's account of the shipwreck differed from Gostling's, claiming that the loss of the other fifteen sailors had been due to dishonourable actions and abandonment of the crew. The East India Company launched an action against Gostling which found him liable for the loss of the cargo and required him to pay the Company compensation of £25,000.

John Dean returned to London in September 1741 something of a celebrity. His story had been published as a pamphlet and a mezzotint of a portrait of John Dean made by John Faber from a portrait by William Verelst was widely circulated. The Company had used Dean's account to its significant advantage and, in recognition, gave him the post of Elder Porter and commissioned three portraits from William Verelst, an obvious choice as he had executed the earlier depiction. These depictions were very different: the earlier shows Dean against an imagined Madagascan background, bare chested and with an axe and spear; the later portraits show him as a prosperous London citizen, fully clothed with hat and stick. One of the portraits was installed in East India House and one went into store while the third disappeared.

A short poem entitled On seeing the Picture of Miss R... G...n, Drawn by Mr. Verelst; of Threadneedle-street was published anonymously in 1750. (Note: The anonymous poem was later included in the collected works of Christopher Smart.) It refers to Matthew Prior's poem praising Simon Verelst, A Flower painted by Simon Verelst, to William's advantage:

And shall no just, impartial bard be found,
Thy more exalted merits to reſound;
Who giv'st to beauty a perpetual bloom,
And lively grace, which age shall not consume;
Who mak'st the speaking eyes with meaning roll,
And paint'st at once the body, and the soul?

In October 1751 Verelst was declared bankrupt, the announcement listing him as 'late of Threadneedle street, painter, dealer and chapman' (where 'chapman' was a legal device to assert that the debtor was a trader and thus could avoid debtors' prison). Unlike his father's bankruptcy of 1727, there is no record of a sale to raise money. William died in the following year, intestate and with no inventory. The Filmers were not surprised, an acquaintance of having predicted the bankruptcy some time earlier.

== Selected works ==
- Audience given by the Trustees of Georgia to a delegation of Creek Indians, 1736, oil on canvas, 123.2 cm × 155.9 cm, Wilmington (DE), Winterthur Museum, Garden & Library, inv. 1956.0567.
- Portrait of a lady with a dove, 1736, oil on canvas, 146 cm × 120 cm (framed), signed (with the same signature as in correspondence with the Filmers) and dated, sold by Titan Fine Art, London.
- Portrait of a lady in a blue dress, holding a hat (Eleanor Mytton?), 1738, oil on canvas, 125.7 cm × 99.1 cm.
- Portrait of John Dean, 1743, oil on canvas, 148.0 x 102.0 cm, London, British Library, inv. Foster 19.
- Portrait of John Dean, 1743, oil on canvas, 148.0 x 102.0 cm, London, British Library, inv. Foster 19A.

Prints

- John Faber (the younger) after William Verelst, Tomo Chachi Mico, or King of Yamacraw, and Tooanahowi, His Nephew, 1734, mezzotint with engraving on laid paper, 34.9 cm × 22.9 cm, British Museum, inv. 1902,1011.1904.
- John Faber (the younger) after William Verelst, John Dean, 1741, mezzotint, 35.5 cm x 25.0 cm, British Museum, inv. 1902,1011.1346.
