= Pieter Hermansz Verelst =

Dutch painter

- Born: c. 1616-1618; Dordrecht
- Died: c. November 1668; England
- Citizenship: Dutch
- Occupation: painter
- Years active: 1640-1668
- Spouses: Adriana van Gesel (m. 11 July 1638–before September 1659); Elisabeth Schölts (m. 30 September 1659-before 1668)
- Parents: Herman Verelst (father); Marieke Backx (mother)
- Relatives: Herman Verelst (son); Simon Verelst (son); John Verelst (1648-1679) (son); William Verelst (1651–1702) (son); Lodvick Verelst (grandson); John Verelst (c. 1670-1734) (grandson); Michael Verelst (grandson); Adriana Verelst (granddaughter); William Verelst (1704-1752) (great grandson); Harry Verelst (colonial governor) (great great grandson)

An Italian street scene with Bamboccianti playing cards and a quack preparing concoctions
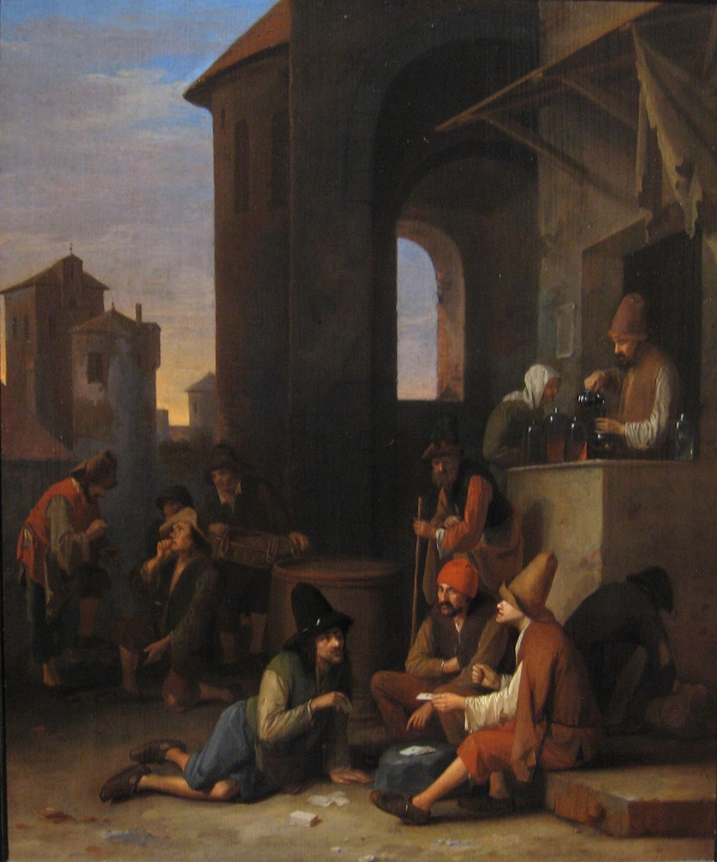
- An Italian street scene with Bamboccianti playing cards and a quack preparing concoctions
- Artist: Pieter Hermansz Verelst
- Year: c. 1640-1668
- Medium: Oil on panel
- Dimensions: 34.0 cm × 28.0 cm (13.4 in × 11.0 in)
- Location: Private collection

Pieter Harmensz Verelst (c. 1616-1618, Dordrecht – 1668 in England) was a Dutch Golden Age painter. Four of his sons, Herman, Simon, John (1648-1679) and William (1651–1702), also became painters. (Note: A full family tree is given by Peter Hancox.)

== Biography ==
Verelst was born in Dordrecht probably in 1616 or possibly 1618 to Herman Verelst and his second wife, Marieke Backx. He married Adriana van Gesel in Dordrecht on 3 August 1638 having become engaged on 11 July 1638. Verelst had nine children with Adriana who died before September 1657. (Note: The burial of Adriana Verelst (née van Gesel) has not been traced. It was likely to have taken place in The Hague from mid 1651 to autumn 1657.) He married Elisabeth Schölts on 30 September 1657. Elisabeth had two daughters. She died somewhere between 1659 (the date of birth of her second child) and 1668.

Pieter moved with some of his children to London in 1668, possibly to live with Simon, and died in England in or about November 1668. (Note: Pieter Verelst's death in England is recorded in his son John's response to an attempt by Simon Verelst to sue him. Not knowing of John's bill of pleading, G.H. Veth found evidence of a Pieter Verelst working as a brewer in Hulst and suggested that this could be identified with the painter of the same name.)

== Artistic career ==
There is no evidence of Verelst's training. Assertions that he was trained by Gerard Dou or Jacob Gerritsz Cuyp are without evidence except on grounds of style. Given Verelst's eclectic style, it is possible to discern the influence of a number of possible teachers.

Verelst's early career was in Dordrecht where he became of member of the city's Guild of Saint Luke in 1638. He worked there and in Rotterdam (where his eldest son, Herman, was baptised in 1641) until c. 1643 when he moved to The Hague. There he joined The Hague Guild of Saint Luke and, in 1656, co-founded the Confrerie Pictura of which he served as deacon in 1659-1660 and possibly also in 1665.

The careers of Pieter Verelst and his sons Herman, Simon and John were all badly affected by the slump in the art market in the Low Countries in the 1660s. In a deposition to the Court of Chancery, John refers to Pieter as being “reduced to greate straite & want of monys“ and it was at this time that Pieter moved with some of his children to London.

Verelst trained his sons Herman, Simon, John and probably William. In part, their training consisted of producing flower and fruit pieces on paper and pasteboard. A dispute in Pieter’s workshop in The Hague led to a court case in which a number of pupils were named either as participants in or witnesses to a brawl. These included Otto Hoynck, Gabriel Sierick, Abraham de Haen (fl. 1638-after 1663) and Hendrik Monij.

Genre and history pieces

Verelst is most associated with peasant interiors, usually of taverns with peasants smoking, carousing or arguing. While these scenes may recall those of Philips Koninck or Adriaen van Ostade, their style is more similar to that of Gerard Dou. Fred Meijer has identified Verelst as the painter of The Return of Tobias and the Angel previously attributed to Rembrandt.

Portraits

Stylistically, Verelst’s early portraits are similar to those of the Rembrandt school, notably Govert Flinck or Jan Victors. Later portraits are characterised by an emphasis on elegance, for instance in the depiction of silky fabrics.

Still-lifes

Verelst did not produce a large number of still-lifes. The game pieces have unusual combinations of objects with an overall compositional arrangement suggestive of Michiel Simons (fl.1648–1673).

== Selected works ==
Genre and history pieces

- Boors playing at cards, 1653, oil on canvas, 32.0 cm × 27.0 cm, signed and dated. Richmond, Surrey, Ham House (National Trust), inv. NT 1139902.
- Three peasants in a tavern, c. 1638–1668, pen and brown ink, with brown wash, over black chalk, on paper, 14.6 cm × 16.4 cm, signed (PVE). Oxford, Ashmolean Museum, inv. WA1863.299.
- Zechende Bauern [Carousing farmers], c. 1638–1668, oil on wood, 46.0 cm × 71.0 cm (unframed). Vienna, Kunsthistorisches Museum, inv. Gemäldegalerie, 616.
- Rauchende Bauern [Smoking farmers], c. 1638–1668, oil on wood, 29.0 cm × 35.0 cm (unframed), signed (PVE). Vienna, Kunsthistorisches Museum, inv. Gemäldegalerie, 718.
- The Return of Tobias and the Angel, c. 1645, oil on canvas, 108.5 cm × 143.0 cm. Private collection.

Portraits

- Portrait d'Agatha van Hartigsvelt [Portrait of Agatha van Hartigsvelt] , 1642, oil on wood. Dijon, Musée des Beaux-Arts, inv. 77.
- Bildnis einer Frau [Portrait of a woman], 1648, oil on wood, 68.6 cm × 54.4 cm, signed (P.Verelst) and dated. Berlin, Gemäldegalerie, inv. 830.
- Tête de vieillard [Old man’s head], 1648, oil on wood, 72.3 cm × 55.0 cm, signed (P.Verelst) and dated. Toulouse, musée des Augustins, inv. 2004 1 200; 485 (Ro); D 1961 16.

Still-lifes

- Still life with cups, römer glass, fruit and a box with bottles, 1654, oil on canvas, 92.0 cm × 112.4 cm. London, Christie’s, sale, 20 February 1981, lot 49.
- Kitchen still-life, 1655, oil on canvas, 118.0 cm × 164.0 cm, signed and dated. London, Christie’s, sale, 9 February 1979, lot 32.
- Dead birds and accessories of the hunt, c. 1638-1668, oil on canvas, 43.0 cm × 35.5 cm, signed. Denmark, private collection.
