= Herman Verelst =

Anglo-Dutch painter

- Born: Rotterdam
- Baptised: 5 December 1641
- Died: late July/early August 1699; London, England
- Burial place: St Giles in the Fields, London
- Citizenship: Dutch
- Occupation: portrait painter
- Years active: 1660-1699
- Spouse: Cecilia Verelst (née Fend)
- Parents: Pieter Verelst (father); Adriana van Gesel (mother)
- Relatives: Simon Verelst (brother); John Verelst (1648-1679) (brother); William Verelst (1651–1702) (brother); Lodvick Verelst (son); John Verelst (c. 1670-1734) (son); Michael Verelst (son); Adriana Verelst (daughter); William Verelst (1704-1752) (grandson); Harry Verelst (colonial governor) (great grandson)

John Locke
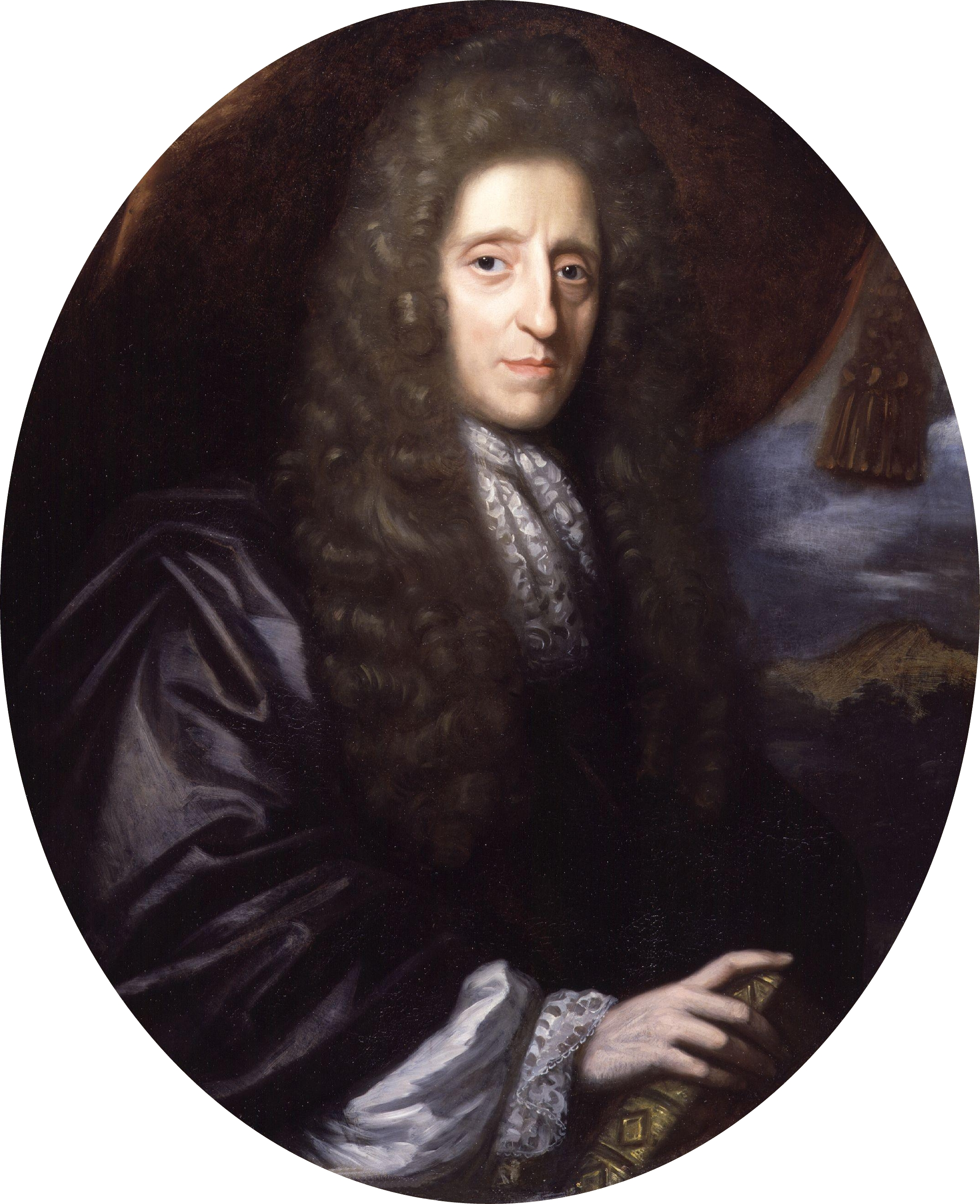
- Artist: Herman Verelst
- Year: 1689
- Medium: Oil on canvas
- Dimensions: 90.2 cm × 75.6 cm (35.5 in × 29.8 in)
- Location: National Portrait Gallery, London

Portret van een man
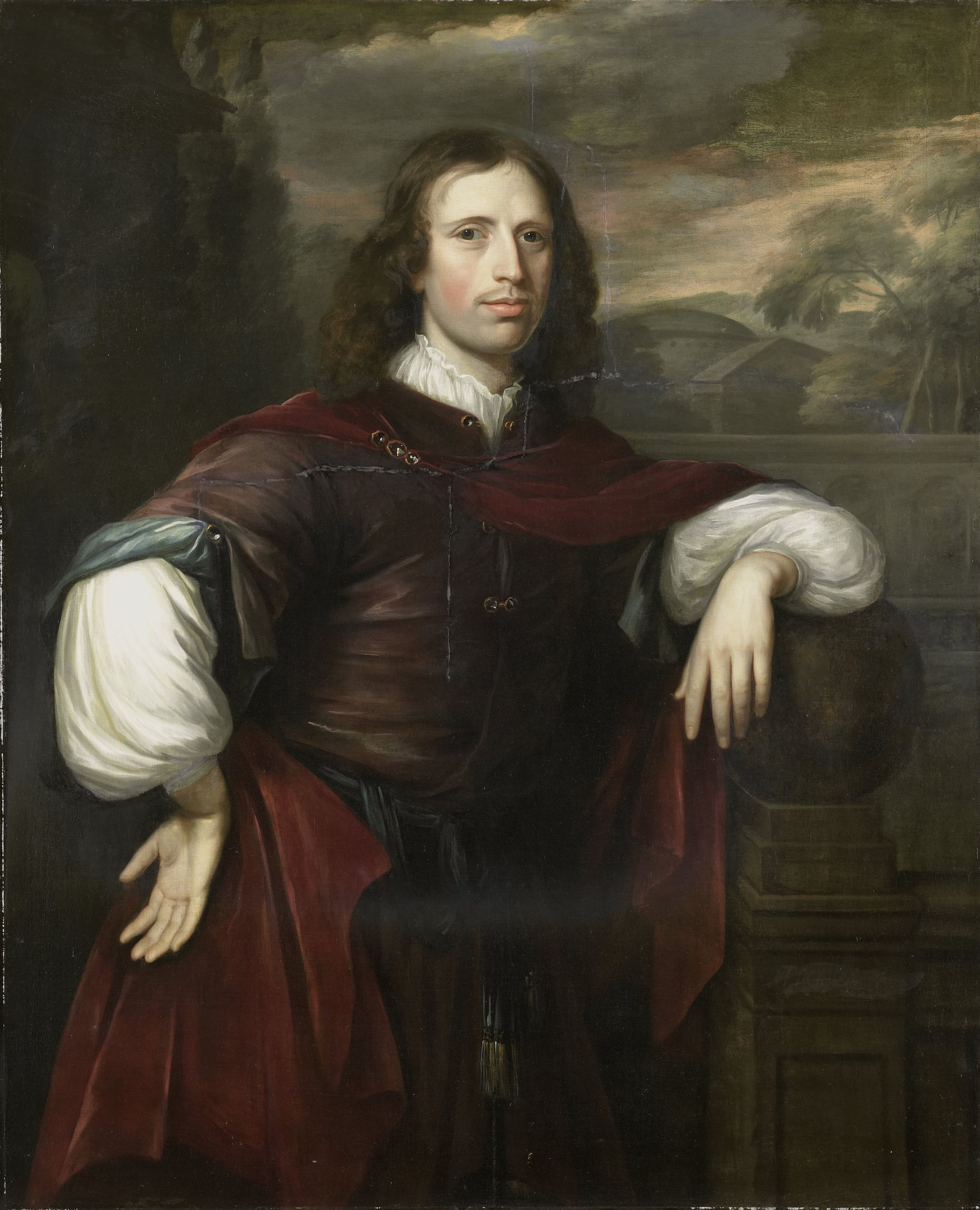
- Artist: Herman Verelst
- Year: 1667
- Medium: Oil on canvas
- Dimensions: 107.0 cm × 104.0 cm (42.1 in × 40.9 in)
- Location: Rijksmuseum, Amsterdam

Herman Verelst (1641, Rotterdam – 1699, London) was an Anglo-Dutch painter.

== Biography ==
Verelst (baptized 5 December 1641, Rotterdam) was the eldest son of Pieter Verelst and his first wife, Adriana van Gesel. Pieter Verelst was a successful artist working mainly in The Hague and was followed into painting by four of his sons: Herman, Simon, John (1648–1679) and William (1651–1702). Herman was trained in The Hague by his father alongside his brothers Simon and John, mainly on fruit and flower pieces painted on paper and pasteboard. Pieter Verelst also trained artists in his workshop. A court case of 1657 ruling on a brawl in the workshop gives the names of several pupils, including Herman. Verelst became a member of the Confrerie Pictura of The Hague in 1663, at the same time as his brother Simon. Pieter had been the Dean of the Confrerie in 1659–1660.

Fairly soon after, Verelst moved to Amsterdam where he married Cecilia Fend from Venice. The couple went on to have at least seven children of which Lodvick, John, Michael and Adriana became artists with varying levels of success. Cornelius Verelst and Maria Verelst are often identified as their children. There is no record of these names amongst their children, arguably being due to errors made in near-contemporary biographies.

Verelst's early career in Amsterdam coincided with a collapse in the art market in the Low Countries in the late 1660s. His father and siblings left The Hague in about 1667 but Verelst was still working in Amsterdam in 1670 where he sued a Johannes van Keulen for payment in advance for two paintings.

Reliable evidence for Verelst's travels in Europe comes from the genealogical records of his children. The family were in Venice in the mid-1670s. Their son John seems to have been born after the family left The Netherlands because there is no record of birth or baptism. Their next son, Michael, applied for naturalisation in London in 1701 stating that he had been born in Venice. His birth must have been around 1675. A daughter, Catharina Helena, was baptized in the cathedral in Ljubljana in February 1678. Anna Catharina was born and died in Vienna in 1681. The family fled the Turkish siege of Vienna in 1683 with one last child, Adriana, either born in Vienna or on the road to London. John and Adriana jointly applied for naturalisation in 1711. (Note: A full family tree is given by Peter Hancox.)

Verelst was able to establish himself as primarily a portrait painter when he arrived in London. Two of his brothers, the famous Simon and the less-famous William Verelst, were working as painters. In 1692, Matthew Smith wrote: "Mr. Harman Verelst Paints well by the Life and was in good Repute in Germany; he likewise Paints Fruit etc very fine". Bainbrigg Buckridge, writing in 1706 shortly after Verelst's death: "He painted History, Fruit and Flowers, after a very Manner very pleasant and well coloured. ... He studied some time at Rome, and resided a while in the Emperor’s court at Vienna, which City he left upon the Turks coming before it in 1683."

Verelst died in late July or early August 1699 and was buried at St Giles in the Fields, London. If there were a will, it has not survived. Cecilia was granted probate. Verelst seemed to have provided generously for his children: when Adriana was separating from her husband in 1717, her husband claimed that she had been apportioned a share of household goods, furniture, pictures and other possessions. An auction of his picture collection was held in 1702 organised by his son Peter. The catalogue includes a number of paintings by Verelst's brother William who had died in 1702. It seems that Verelst's sale was used by the family to dispose of art belonging to the less well-known William.

== Selected works ==
- Virgin, Child and Saint John, 1665, oil on canvas, 132.2 cm × 193.3 cm, signed and dated. Barnard Castle, Co. Durham, The Bowes Museum, inv. B.M.554.
- Cornelis Calkoen (1639-1710), 1666, oil on canvas, 120.0 cm × 93.0 cm. The Hague, Instituut Collectie Nederland, inv. C1785.
- Petronella Haack (1638-1683), 1666, oil on canvas, 120.0 cm × 93.0 cm. The Hague, Instituut Collectie Nederland, inv. C1786.
- Portret van een man [Portrait of a man], 1667, oil on canvas, 127.0 cm × 104.0 cm, signed (H. Verlest) and dated. Amsterdam, Rijksmuseum, inv. SK-C-24.
- Portret van een vrouwn [Portrait of a woman], 1667, oil on canvas, 127.0 cm × 104.0 cm, signed (H. Verlest) and dated. Amsterdam, Rijksmuseum, inv. SK-C-25.
- Peaches, grapes and redcurrants on a ledge, c. 1669, oil on canvas, 74.3 cm × 62.3 cm. Oxford, Worcester College, inv. 024.
- Janez Jakob pl. Wiederkehrn [Johann Jacob von Wiederkehr], 1678, oil on canvas, 103.5 cm × 84.0 cm. Ljubljana, Narodna galerija, inv. NG S 649.
- Marija Elizabeta Wiederkehr, 1681, oil on canvas, 103.0 cm × 84.5 cm. Ljubljana, Narodna galerija, inv. NG S 634.
- Member of the Dashwood Family, c. 1683, oil on canvas, 94.0 cm × 79.0 cm. London, Guildhall Art Gallery, inv. 1568.
- Portrait of a lady, thought to be Dionesse Cullum, wife of Robert Colman, c. 1685, oil on canvas, 75.0 cm × 63.0 cm. London, Tate Gallery, inv. T07241.
- John Locke, 1689, oil on canvas, 90.2 cm × 75.6 cm. London, National Portrait Gallery, inv. 3846.
- Portrait of a lady with a dog, 1689, oil on canvas, 124.5 cm × 101.5 cm. Preston, Lancs, Harris Museum & Art Gallery, inv. PRSMG : P182.
