= Harry Verelst (colonial governor) =

British colonial administrator (1734–1785)

- Born: 11 February 1734; Hanbury, Worcestershire, England
- Died: 24 October 1785 (aged 51); Boulogne-sur-Mer, France
- Resting place: Minster-in-Thanet, Kent, England
- Occupation: colonial administrator
- Spouse: Ann Wordsworth
- Parents: Robert Verelst (father); Elizabeth Verelst (née Bach) (mother)
- Relatives: Pieter Verelst (great great grandfather); Herman Verelst (great grandfather); Simon Verelst (great great uncle); John Verelst (1648–1679) (great great uncle); William Verelst (1651–1702) (great great uncle); Lodvick Verelst (great uncle); John Verelst (c. 1670-1734) (grandfather); Michael Verelst (great uncle); Adriana Verelst (great aunt); William Verelst (1704-1752) (uncle)

Governor of the Presidency of Bengal
- In office January 1767 – December 1769
- Preceded by: Robert Clive
- Succeeded by: John Cartier

Harry Verelst (11 February 1734 – 24 October 1785) was a colonial administrator with the British East India Company who served as the governor of Bengal from 1767 to 1769.

Verelst travelled to India as a Company employee at a young age and rose through the ranks after many years of service, becoming a close supporter of Governor Robert Clive and eventually succeeding him as governor. Like his predecessor, Verelst attempted to reform the Company's administration in Bengal, but he lacked Clive's authority. He took steps to curb corruption and abuses within the Company and to gather information on local laws and customs. He faced opposition from the Company's servants and resigned after nearly three years in office.

After returning to Britain in 1770, he engaged in public polemics about his tenure and British rule in Bengal with William Bolts, a disgruntled former Company employee, and faced lawsuits incited by the latter. The exchanges between Bolts and Verelst stimulated the public discussion about the Company's governance in India. Failing to transport much of his wealth from India, Verelst fell into dire financial straits and fled to the continent to evade his creditors. He died in France in 1785.

== Life and career ==
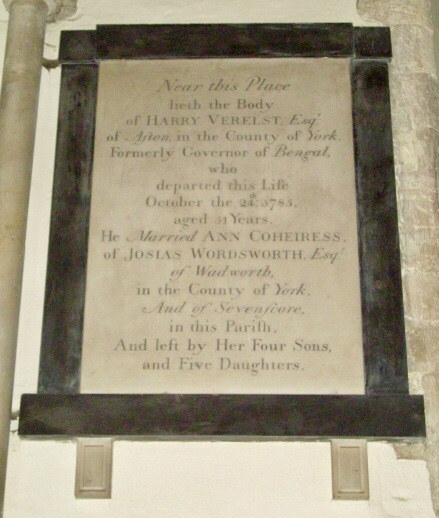
Memorial to Harry Verelst in St Mary's Church, Minster-in-Thanet, Kent.

Verelst was born on 11 February 1734 in Fladbury, Worcestershire, the fourth child to Robert Verelst and Elizabeth Verelst (née Bach). (Note: Robert Verelst (21 November 1702 - 27 July 1745) was the fifth child of John Verelst (c. 1670 – 7 March 1734), a fairly successful portrait painter. Elizabeth Bach (6 February 1700 – c. 1761) was from Chaddesley Corbett, Worcestershire. They were married on 11 May 1722. Robert was buried on 27 July 1745 at Fladbury. Elizabeth's place and exact date of death is not known.) The Verelsts were a long established family of painters, Pieter Verelst (his great-great-grandfather) having brought the family to England from the Low Countries in 1668. Robert had been brought up in London and was unusual amongst his siblings in moving to a rural location. Two of Robert's brothers (and hence Harry's uncles) worked in India, as did two of his sons and two sons-in-law. (Note: Two of Harry Verelst's paternal uncles worked for the East India Company.: George (born 20 March 1708 and baptised on 5 April 1708) travelled to India as a soldier on the Monmouth. In 1724 he wanted a discharge from service and had left the Company before July 1726 to work in China and an application to rejoin the East India Company was refused, apparently for lack of a good record of service. There is no record of his death or burial.; James was born on 5 March 1709 and baptised on 15 March 1709. He arrived in India on 7 January 1726 where he worked as a Writer (clerk) for the East India Company and in September 1738 he was listed as a Senior Merchant at Tellicherry. He was buried at Bombay on 26 November 1741.; Harry Verelst's two brothers (both younger) also joined the East India Company.: John (baptised 11 July 1736) was buried on 27 August 1760 at Calcutta.; William Fraser was baptised on 9 February 1738. There is no record of his death.; Two of his sisters married husbands who worked for the East India Company.: Ann (baptised 2 March 1723) married (23 February 1744) Samuel Court, a supercargo for the Company. She died in India on 16 November 1754 and was buried at the British Cemetery in Surat.; Adriana Caecilia (baptised 11 November 1731) married Paul Richard Pearkes in Calcutta. She returned to London, being buried at St Christopher Le Stock in March 1758.; Their uncle, William Verelst, had taken responsibility for the education of Harry, John and William Fraser Verelst. Harry noted that his uncle did not direct his choice of future career.) It was not surprising that Harry Verelst also joined the East India Company.

Harry Verelst's education was the responsibility of his uncle, the well-connected portrait painter William Verelst and he went on to gain employment as a writer (office clerk) in the East India Company's Bengal establishment. He arrived in Calcutta in 1749. In 1756 he was appointed head of the Company's factory at Lakshmipur. A few months later, he was forced to take refuge at Falta with the Company's council after Nawab Siraj ud-Daulah's attack on Calcutta. After Calcutta was retaken, he set out for Lakshmipur once again but was imprisoned by officers of the Nawab in violation of the treaty made by the latter with Robert Clive. He remained in captivity for two months and was released after the Company victory at the Battle of Plassey. After his appointment as chief of the Lakshmipur factory was successfully contested by a higher-ranking Company servant, Verelst returned to Calcutta. In 1759 he became overseer of revenue collection in the Nadia district, then took on a similar task in Burdwan. In February 1760 he took up his seat in the Company council in Calcutta. At the end of that year, he was sent to take control of the southern port of Chittagong, which had been ceded by Nawab Mir Qasim.

Verelst returned from Chittagong in 1765 to serve on the Select Committee under Clive's second term as governor. In 1765 and 1766 he successfully oversaw and reformed revenue collection at Burdwan and later at Midnapore. He became one of Clive's close supporters and on several occasions acted as governor when Clive was absent or indisposed. He succeeded Clive as governor of Bengal in January 1767. Verelst tried to continue the policies of his predecessor, Robert Clive, whom he greatly admired. Clive sought to suppress corruption and abuses among the Company's servants, which caused discontent within the Company's ranks. However, Verelst did not enjoy the same authority as Clive and had little success continuing his predecessor's policies. He recognised the need for reform in Bengal to strengthen the Company's government there but did not act to replace Clive's dual system, whereby the Company preserved the appearance of the sovereignty of local rulers while effectively ruling over Bengal. He believed that Bengal should be governed according to local laws and took measures to acquire information "laws and customs of the country". Verelst also gained a reputation for his uprightness. Edmund Burke, a prominent critic of the Company, later described him "one of the honestest men that ever served the Company". Robert Clive opined that he was a humane and disinterested but "too lenient" administrator. Aware of his weak position, Verelst was eager to be replaced as governor. He resigned in December 1769. John Cartier was his successor.

Verelst returned to Britain in 1770. In 1772 William Bolts, a former Company employee who had clashed with Verelst and been deported to Britain, published the first volume of his book Considerations on India Affairs, in which he criticised the system of British government in Bengal and condemned what he considered to be the corruption of Clive's and Verelst's administrations. Later that year, Verelst published his response to Bolts accusations, a book titled View of the Rise, Progress and Present State of the English Government in Bengal. The lively polemics between Bolts and Verelst stimulated the great public debate that was occurring at the time about the Company's governance in India. Verelst also had to contend with lawsuits initiated against him with the help of William Bolts. Four Armenians, three of which had formerly worked as Bolts's agents, accused Verelst of ordering their unlawful imprisonment. Verelst lost the cases and was ordered to pay a total of £9700 in damages. He was eventually compensated by the East India Company, but by this time his financial situation was already deteriorating. Much of his fortune, which he estimated at £142,711 in 1772, was still in Bengal and was at risk of being lost because of the worsening economic situation there. His purchase of the Aston estate near Sheffield for £49,800 further strained his finances. In 1775 Verelst's secretary, John Knott, travelled to Bengal to collect his own and his employer's belongings. In the meantime, Verelst borrowed money to cover his immediate expenses, expecting Knott to return with more of his wealth. However, Knott died in the desert on the overland route back to Britain, and all of the papers and possessions he was transporting were lost with him. Verelst's finances never recovered from this loss. In 1785 he left for the European continent to evade his creditors. He died on 24 October 1785 at Boulogne and was buried at Minster in the Isle of Thanet.

== Family ==
In Bengal Verelst had two daughters and a son out of wedlock with Sophia Yeandle, a mixed-race Catholic woman. He married Ann Wordsworth on 20 May 1771, and they had six daughters and four sons. The eldest son, Harry (1773–1837), married Elizabeth, daughter of Henry Arthur Herbert. The eldest daughter Anne married the Irish Member of Parliament Edward Synge Cooper.
