= Adriana Verelst =

English painter

- Born: c. 1683
- Died: buried 22 January 1769 (aged 85–86); London, England
- Burial place: St Andrew’s, Holborn, London, England
- Occupation: portrait painter
- Years active: 1720-1735
- Known for: commissions for James Brydges, 1st Duke of Chandos
- Spouse: Richard Baker
- Parents: Herman Verelst (father); Cecilia Verelst (née Fend) (mother)
- Relatives: Pieter Verelst (grandfather); Simon Verelst (uncle); John Verelst (1648-1679) (uncle); William Verelst (1651-1702) (uncle); Lodvick Verelst (brother); John Verelst (c. 1670-1734) (brother); Michael Verelst (brother); William Verelst (1704–1752) (nephew); Harry Verelst (colonial governor) (great nephew)

Grisell Baillie Lady Murray
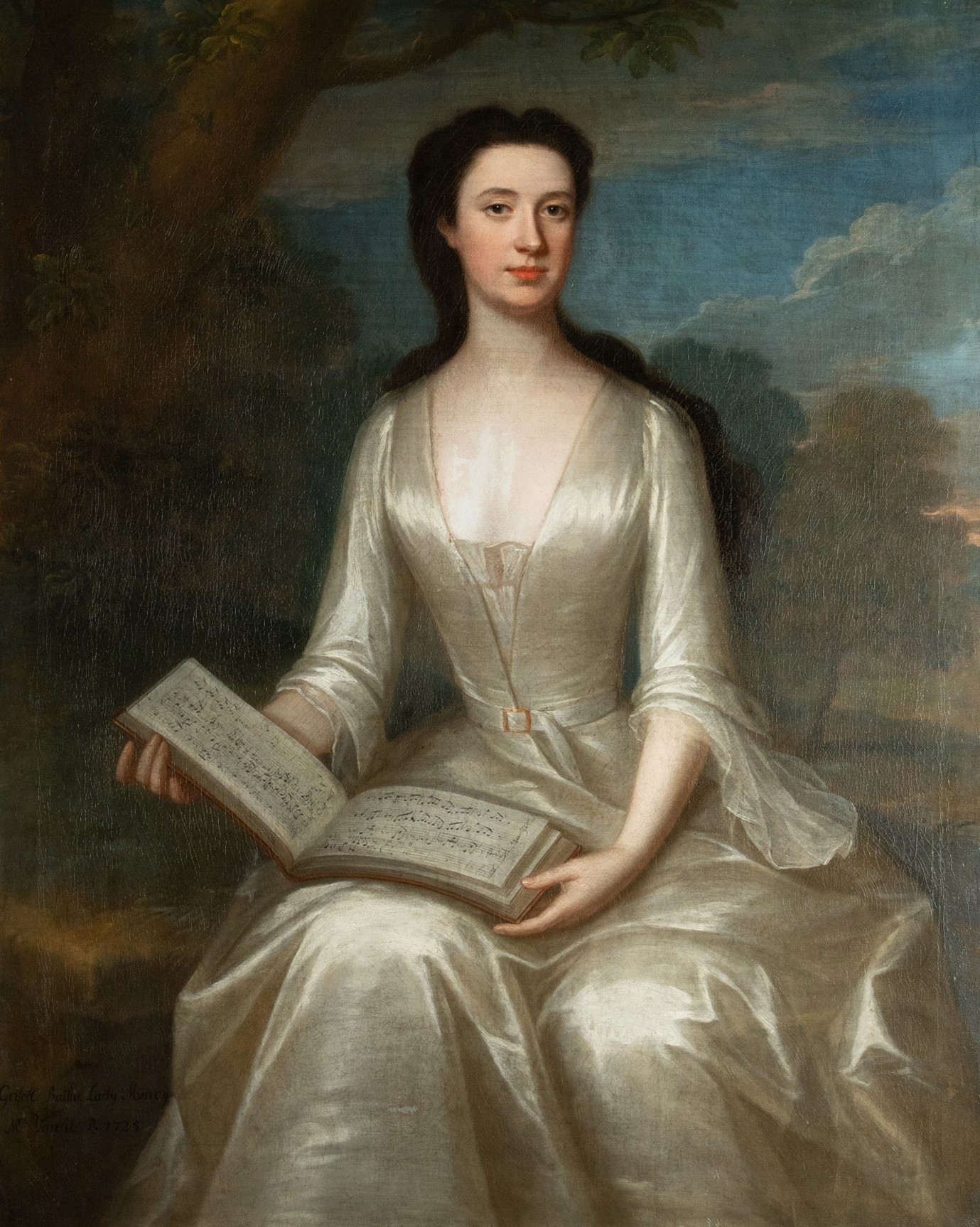
- Inscription (but not signed and dated): Grisell Baillie Lady Murray // Mrs Varelst P. 1725
- Artist: Adriana Verelst
- Year: 1725
- Medium: Oil on canvas
- Subject: Grisel Baillie (25 Oct 1692-6 June 1759), later Lady Murray
- Location: Music Room, Mellerstain House, Gordon, TD3 6LG

Adriana Verelst (c. 1683–1769) was an English portrait painter who was patronised by James Brydges, 1st Duke of Chandos and Cassandra Willoughby, Duchess of Chandos. She was the daughter of Herman Verelst, niece of Simon Verelst, sister of John Verelst (1670–1734) and aunt to William Verelst (1651–1702).

== Biography ==
Verelst was the only surviving daughter of Herman Verelst (a portrait painter) and Cecilia Fend, originally from Venice. The date and place of her birth are uncertain. Her parents had been in Vienna from where they fled from the Turkish siege of 1683 to London. Another daughter, Anna Catharina had been born and had died in Vienna in 1681. Verelst was granted British citizenship in 1711 (showing that she wasn't born in Britain). The marriage bond for her wedding of 4 June 1717 gave her age as about 34. Given that her parents arrived in London in 1684, the likely year of birth would be 1682, 1683 or 1684. Thus she may have been born in Vienna or on the road from there to England.

In 1711, Adriana and her brother, John Verelst, applied for naturalization.

Her marriage bond described Verelst as a spinster of St Giles in the Fields (where her father had been buried). Her husband was Richard Baker, a widower of St Andrew's Holborn with one daughter, aged about 42. His occupation was as a plumber and he seems to have been a person of some standing. The marriage took place on 6 June 1717 at St Michael Queenhithe.

Within four months, the marriage had broken down. As soon as 7 October 1717, Richard Baker had made a deposition to the Court of Equity. Baker claimed that, as husband, all of Verelst's property was rightfully his and should have been made over to him, including her inheritance from her father. However, he claimed, Verelst had sold a substantial amount of goods (including pictures) to a local dealer on or about 29 August 1717. He appealed to the court for restitution of his property or compensation. The outcome was that Richard and Verelst agreed to separate and live apart. A judgement of 25 November 1718 awarded her an annuity of £40 per annum for life for ‘separate maintenance and in lieu and satisfaction of any Demand Right or Title’ that she might later claim. Richard Baker died intestate on 12 December 1732. A subsequent inventory revealed substantial wealth including a house and lease on farms in Highgate. She did claim Richard Baker's inheritance on his death (he having died intestate) but lost with the estate awarded to Baker's daughter from his first marriage, Elizabeth Pearce.

Verelst lived with Cecilia, her mother, presumably having also lived with her parents before her father's death in 1699. Cecilia may have died in autumn 1722. Adriana had a reputation as a successful artist when she married in 1717. Archival evidence of commissions has survived along with a number of family portraits listed in the inventories of Cannons and St James's Square.

There is no further documented evidence of artistic activity after summer 1725. Verelst does not appear by name in contemporary art histories, either published in the Low Countries or in England. Jacob Campo Weyerman included an unnamed daughter of Herman Verelst in his De levens-beschryvingen der Nederlandsche konst-schilders en konst-schilderessen of 1729. Weyerman states that he had seen some of her work in London, describing her as a history and portrait painter and a follower of her uncle, Simon Verelst, which makes it a little surprising that her works did not include flower pieces. (Note: Weyerman does not explicitly name Simon Verelst as Adriana’s teacher. However, Weyerman includes Adriana’s biography immediately after that of Simon and links the two in this text.) (By implication, Weyerman was giving London as her place of domicile and work.) He explicitly comments that he didn't know of her death and so leaving it open as to whether she was still alive in 1729. Weyerman is the first author to give a story of a visit to the theatre in Drury Lane where she was able to show her ability in English, German, Latin and Italian and noted her musical prowess. The evidence on which these comments are based is not made clear.

By 1717, she had developed a close friendship with Henrietta Skelton, a wealthy heiress from West Bromwich and living in London. Henrietta's will was written in 1731 (immediately prior to the death of Richard Baker) and included the provision that Verelst's inheritance was ‘for sole and separate use of Mrs Adriana Baker … in such manner that the said Richard Baker shall have no power or control … therewith’. Henrietta's wealth was substantial and left Verelst well provided for as is shown by the scale of her own legacies to her servants which drew both on her chattels and on three percent bank annuities.

Verelst died in January 1769 at the age of about 86. Her will of July 1765 shows that she was living in the house of a John Duddle, an undertaker and the parish records give her address as Hatton Garden. Adriana requested that her body should be interred ‘in the Rectors Vault in the parish Church of Saint Andrew Holbourne as near as possible to my dearest friend Mrs Henrietta Shelton”.

== Identification with Maria Verelst ==
There is no contemporary documentary evidence for the life of Maria Verelst, often described by later authors as the daughter of Herman Verelst. This is in complete contrast to Adriana Verelst where there is contemporary evidence for birth, marriage, career and death but she is not included in later art histories. Peter Hancox has argued that “Maria Verelst” is a misnaming of Adriana Verelst caused by later art dictionary editors expanding abbreviated forms of her name given by authors from Weyerman onwards (“N Verelst”, “Mlle Verelst”, “M. Verelst”) into a fuller form of the name.

== Artistic works ==
Over the years, a number of portraits have been attributed to Maria Verelst. The basis of the attribution does not always seem sound. Adriana had a distinctive written signature (like her nephew, William Verelst whose signature on his portraits is very closely similar to his written signature). Works dated and signed with her distinctive “Mrs Verelst” or “A. Verelst” signature would be useful in making attributions of unsigned works.

There is evidence during Verelst's lifetime of her work. The documents associated with her separation from Richard Baker include the statement that she sold “One hundred and Thirty Six Pictures of which Eight and Thirty are unfinished and most of the rest are Family Pieces”. These may not have been all by Verelst herself. Her brother, John Verelst’s sale of 1718 included three pieces by ‘Mrs Verelst’. (Note: The catalogue survives as a transcription. As there is no piece by John Verelst, it is possible that “Mrs Verelst” is a mis-transcription of “Mr Verelst”.: A Shepherd and Shepherdess (lot 12); Two of the Muses (lot 46); Two Vanities (lot 73))

There is substantial evidence that, by 1725, Verelst had received aristocratic and gentry commissions. She issued receipts for a small portrait for Rosamund Greenwood of Watnall and for alterations to a portrait for Emma Child. The most substantial commissions came from James Brydges, 1st Duke of Chandos and his second wife, Cassandra Willoughby for display at their main house of Cannons and their London house at St James's Square. Inventories of both houses in summer 1725 listed pictures (almost exclusively portraits) and their locations in the houses. Some were in the public picture rooms while others were in the private rooms.

Pictures listed at Cannons:
Nine portraits and one landscape are listed. The portraits are all of the Duke & Dutchess of Chandos (James Brydges, 1st Duke of Chandos and Cassandra Brydges) or of his siblings or children.

Pictures listed at St James's Square:
Seven portraits of which several are of ancestors of James Brydges.

As these were not sold in posthumous sales of James Brydges's houses and contents, it is probable that some (if not all) portraits passed to the family, perhaps James Brydges’ widow, Lydia Catherine Davall (1693–1750) and to relatives of those depicted.

Portrait mentioned in William Bromfeild's will
In his will written 6 June 1792 and proved 17 December 1792, William Bromfeild left “the picture of my deceased Wife Mrs Irene Bromfield painted by Mrs Verelst”. This portrait has not yet been traced. (Note: Irene Wigate (Wygate, Wigale, Wygale) was born 7 March 1713 to John and Anne Wigate, and baptised in St Giles, Cripplegate later that month. On 22 July 1735, she married William Bromfeild (1713-24 November 1792), a surgeon working in London. They had at least ten children with the last being born on 9 April 1749. Only two survived to adulthood. There is no record of her death. William Bromfeild may have married an Anne Glover in 1758 but there is no certain record. Anne had died by the time he had written his will in 1792.)

Welbeck portraits
The picture collection at Welbeck Abbey was catalogued in 1747, possibly by George Vertue. This included five portraits attributed to “Miss Verelst”, the significance being that Verelst was still alive when this catalogue was compiled.

Mellerstain portraits
There are three portraits at Mellerstain House which have been attributed to Maria Verelst. They seem to date from about 1725 and represent a coherent set of portraits of Lady Grizel Baillie and her daughters, Grizel Baillie, Lady Murray and Rachel Baillie, Lady Binning.
