= Steve Verelst =

Belgian footballer

Steve Verelst (born 9 February 1987) is a Belgian football player who plays in the defensive midfield. He currently plays for Union Royale Namur on loan from R. Charleroi S.C. He previously played for Charleroi in the Belgian First Division.
