= William Verelst (1651–1702) =

Anglo-Dutch painter

- Born: The Hague
- Baptised: 28 June 1651
- Died: early June 1702; London
- Burial place: St Giles in the Fields, London
- Citizenship: Dutch
- Occupation: flower painter
- Years active: 1670-1702
- Spouse: Cecilia Verelst (née Fend)
- Parents: Pieter Verelst (father); Adriana van Gesel (mother)
- Relatives: Herman Verelst (brother); Simon Verelst (brother); John Verelst (1648-1679) (brother); Lodvick Verelst (nephew); John Verelst (c. 1670-1734) (nephew); Michael Verelst (nephew); Adriana Verelst (niece); William Verelst (1704-1752) (great nephew); Harry Verelst (colonial governor) (great great nephew)

William Verelst (1651–1702) was a 17th-century Anglo-Dutch painter who specialised in flower paintings. He was the great uncle of William Verelst (1704-1752), an 18th-century English portrait painter.

== Biography and career ==
William Verelst (baptized 28 June 1651, The Hague) was the eighth child of Pieter Verelst and his first wife, Adriana van Gesel. Pieter Verelst's career as a successful artist suffered in the downturn of the Dutch art market in the 1660s. By 1668, in financial difficulties, Pieter moved with his children to London. Presumably, William was largely taught by his father and may have worked with his elder brother, Simon Verelst, a highly successful flower painter.

William worked in London as a flower painter. A number of his flower pieces were sold in London auctions between 1689-1691. Marshall Smith (1692) praised his work: "Mr. William Verelst Paints Flowers very well." He may have worked with one or more of his brothers to produce flower pieces for the lower price range with works ascribed to "Verelst" rather than to an individual member of the family.

William Verelst was buried in St Giles churchyard, London, on 11 June 1702. Twelve of his paintings (mostly flower pieces) were included in the sale of Herman Verelst's picture collection on 31 December 1702, suggesting the family used the auction of Herman's collection to also dispose of William's works.

== Selected works ==
There are no identifiable works with supporting documentary evidence that they are the work of William Verelst. A number of his works were auctioned in his lifetime or immediately on his death. These are listed below.

- "a large pc of Flowers by William Verelst."
- "a Festin of flowers by William Verelst."
- "a large pc of flowers by Will. Verelst."
- "a pc of flowers by Will. Verelst."
- "a small flower by William Verelst"
- "A Flower piece of William Verelst"
- "A Flower piece of William Verelst"
- "a flower pc William Verelst"
- "a flower pc by William Verelst"
- "a flower pc by William Verelst"
- "a Flower-pot by Mr. William Verelst"
- "a Flower piece of William Verelst"
- "A hanging Bird, Original of W. Verelst"
- "a piece of Fruit by William Verelst"
- "a pc of Flowers, an original of William Verelst"
- "a Flower pc. an orig. of William Verelst"
- "a large Fruit piece by William Verelst"
- "a Flower pc by Will. Verelst very fine"
- "a Flower piece by William Verelst"
- "a Fruit piece by William Verelst"
- "A large piece of Fruit by William Varelst"
- "an orig. Flower pc by Will. Verelst"
- "a Fruit pc by Will. Verelst"
- "a flower piece by William Verelst"
- "A Curious Piece of Flowers and Fruits by Will. Verelst"
- "a flower piece by William Verelst"
- "A Flower piece, by Will. Verelst "
- "A large Flower-piece, by William Verelst"
- "A large Flower-piece, by William Varelst"
- "Grapes very fine by W. Verelst"
- "A Large Flower peice [sic] very fine by W. Verelst"
- "a piece of flowers by William Verelst"
- "A small fruit piece by Wil. Verelst"
- "A Flower piece by William Verelst"
- "A Pheasant by William Verelst"
- "A small fruit piece by William Verelst"
- "A fruit piece by William Verelst"
- "A flower piece by William Verelst"
- "Another ditto [A flower piece by William Verelst] "
- "Daffidilies by William Verelst"
- "A small flower piece by William Verelst"
- "A flower piece by William Verelst"
- "A large flower piece by William Verelst"
- "A flower piece by William Verelst"
- "A fruit piece by William Verelst"
- "A flower piece with Stone-work by William Verelst"
- "A flower piece by William Verelst"
