= John Verelst (1648–1679) =

Anglo-Dutch flower and fruit painter (1648 – 1679)

- Born: The Hague
- Baptised: 29 October 1648
- Died: buried 18 April 1679; London
- Burial place: St Martin in the Fields, London
- Other name: Johannes Verelst
- Citizenship: Dutch
- Occupations: flower and fruit painter
- Years active: 1660-1679
- Spouse: Mary Verelst (née Davis)
- Parents: Pieter Verelst (father); Adriana van Gesel (mother)
- Relatives: Herman Verelst (brother); Simon Verelst (brother); William Verelst (1651–1702) (brother); Lodvick Verelst (nephew); John Verelst (c. 1670–1734) (nephew); Michael Verelst (nephew); Adriana Verelst (niece); William Verelst (1704–1752) (great nephew); Harry Verelst (colonial governor) (great great nephew)

John Verelst (1648, The Hague – 1679, London) was an Anglo-Dutch painter, younger brother to Simon Verelst with whom he worked in London. (Note: Johannes (John) Verelst was baptised on 29 October 1648 at The Hague. Pieter and Adriana Verelst had twin boys baptized on 28 June 1651 at The Hague. One of the twins was William Verelst (1651–1702); the other was Jacob John for whom there is no further record, even of his death.) He is sometimes confused with his nephew, John Verelst (1670–1734).

== Biography ==
John Verelst (baptized 29 October 1648, The Hague) was the sixth child of Pieter Verelst and his first wife, Adriana van Gesel. By 1667, he had moved to Amsterdam.

The art market in the Low Countries collapsed in the late 1660s. John's brother, Simon, may have moved to London by 1667; John's father, Pieter, travelled to London with most of his children in 1668, dying in England in autumn 1668. John chose to travel to France in autumn 1668, leaving only his eldest brother, Herman in Amsterdam.

John was in London by 20 October 1672 when he married Mary Davis (aged about 19) by licence at St. Paul's church, Covent Garden. The allegation for their marriage (Note: A marriage allegation or affidavit was a sworn legal statement that there was no known impediment to the marriage and that the marriage met the requirements of the laws of the Church of England.) was made by Simon Verelst. John and Mary had a daughter, Elizabeth, baptized on 15 March 1674. A son, John, was born in about February 1679. There is no record of an immediate baptism and the boy may have been born outside England. The son was baptized on 10 December 1682 at St Martin in the Fields, London, with his age given as three years, nine months with a note that the father was John Verelst. This seems to be an attempt to record the previously unbaptized boy's legitimacy after the death of his father. (Note: The baptism register reads: "Joh[n] Verelst of John & Mary. Born three years and three quarters".) However, the child died soon after and was buried at Saint Martin in the Fields on 31 December 1682.

John Verelst was buried on 18 April 1679, St Martin in the Fields, London.

== Career and works ==
Information about John Verelst's artistic career comes mainly from one source: a response to previous legal cases in which John was sued by his brother, Simon. This and other information gathered by piecing together his movements gives a fairly precise outline of his career.

John was trained in The Hague by his father alongside his brothers Herman and Simon, mainly on fruit and flower pieces painted on paper and pasteboard. By 1667, John had moved to Amsterdam and his father sent him a collection of about ninety of these training pictures for a reason unclear. With the collapse of the art market in the Low Countries, John travelled to Paris, leaving the training pieces with Herman Verelst. (Herman seems to have abandoned the collection when he moved to Italy a few years later.)

By 1672, John had left France and was resident in London where he married. Simon Verelst was already well-established as an artist and, from the court case, it seems that John worked for or with Simon on producing pieces bearing Simon's name, agreeing to produce no work under his own name or for others. The arrangement turned sour. Simon saw John as a competitor; John saw Simon as attempting to suppress his reputation. John claimed that his skills had begun to eclipse those of Simon, he having "grown to some perfection in the said Art and as many beleive [sic] exceeding the said Symon in skill & Art therein & haveing [sic] thereby the Custom of many persons of honour & quality". John claimed that Simon finished the working relationship, threatening to have John imprisoned or forced to leave England. Then in Easter term 1676, Simon sued John for the collection of training pieces (which had been abandoned in Amsterdam several years earlier), claiming their value to be £1,050. John's counter claim was that the collection consisted of twenty pieces worth no more than £40 and that Simon's case was based on malice due to Simon's perception of a threat to his reputation. The court awarded £500 and costs to Simon in 1677 which John seemingly did not pay. (Note: There are at least two documents relating to the court case have been found at The National Archives, London. The docket is in the Docket book for civil pleas, Easter term 1676, IND1/6062, p. 48, line 2. The second document is John Verelst’s deposition.) John's career thereafter is uncertain. The delayed baptism of his son may be evidence that he was outside of England in early 1679 before returning to London where he died in April of that year; equally John may have stayed in England but other factors may have led to the delay in the baptism.

There is no art work that can be confidently attributed to John. ‘’A Conversation of Gentry’’ was auctioned in 1690 as by "John Verelst" and "A piece of Nymphs by John Verelst" in 1691. Either or both could have been by his nephew John Verelst (1670-1734) at the beginning of his career.

Writing in 1722, George Vertue noted that he had seen in the collection of Mr Broderick "a fine large bunch of white grapes painted by J. Verelst at Hampton Court for K. Charles, not woolly but transparent and finely pencilld". If Vertue's comment is correct, this piece must have been commissioned or completed before the death of King Charles II in 1685.

Given that John Verelst was working (anonymously) for Simon Verelst before the court case of 1676 and that he died in April 1679, there were no more than four years for John Verelst to leave a corpus of work, assuming that he was able to paint during that time.
