= Simon Pietersz Verelst =

Anglo-Dutch flower and portrait painter

- Born: The Hague
- Baptised: 21 September 1644
- Died: c. 1710-1717; London
- Occupations: flower and portrait painter
- Years active: c. 1685-c. 1717
- Spouse: Ann Verelst (née Pember)
- Parents: Pieter Verelst (father); Adriana Verelst (née van Gesel) (mother)
- Relatives: Herman Verelst (brother); John Verelst (1648-1679) (brother); William Verelst (1651-1702) (brother); Lodvick Verelst (nephew); John Verelst (c. 1670-1734) (nephew); Michael Verelst (nephew); Adriana Verelst (niece); William Verelst (1704–1752) (great nephew); Harry Verelst (colonial governor) (great great nephew)

Flower Still-Life
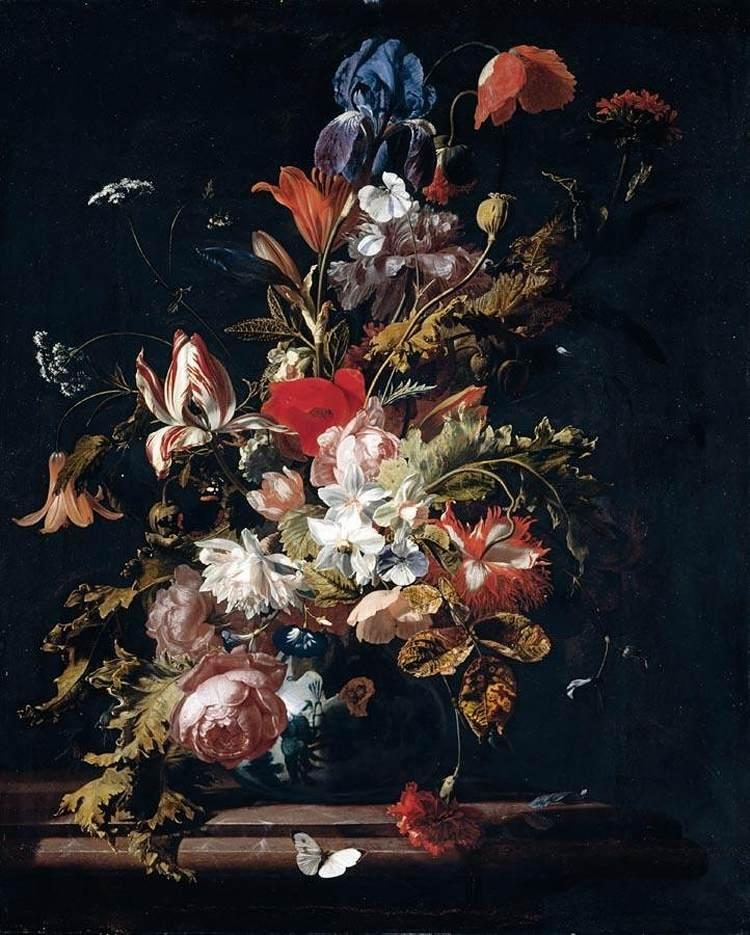
- Flower still life
- Artist: Simon Verelst
- Year: c. 1660-1700
- Medium: Oil on canvas
- Dimensions: 80.0 cm × 66.0 cm (31.5 in × 26.0 in)
- Location: Private collection

Prince Rupert of the Rhine, Count Palatine, Duke of Cumberland (1619-1682)
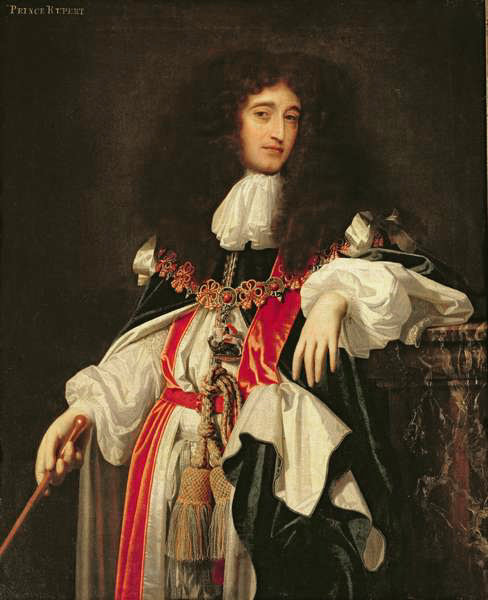
- Prince Rupert of the Rhine
- Artist: Simon Verelst
- Year: c. 1680-1682
- Medium: Oil on canvas
- Dimensions: 126.0 cm × 102.0 cm (49.6 in × 40.2 in)
- Location: Petworth House and Park (National Trust), Petworth
- Accession: NT 486254
- Website: https://www.nationaltrustcollections.org.uk/object/486254

Simon Pietersz Verelst (1644–c. 1710-1717) was an Anglo-Dutch painter. He is known for outstanding flower and fruit still life paintings.

== Biography ==
Simon Pietersz Verelst was the fourth child of Pieter Hermansz Verelst and his first wife, Adriana van Gesel. (Note: A full family tree is given by Peter Hancox.) He was baptised at The Hague on 21 September 1644.

The art market in the Low Countries collapsed in the late 1660s. Simon found himself in extremely difficult financial circumstances and moved from The Hague to London perhaps by 1667. His father and now widower, Pieter, travelled to London with most of his children in 1668, dying in England in autumn 1668, perhaps leaving Simon with responsibility for the family. Samuel Pepys recorded a meeting on 11 April 1669 with “a Dutchman, newly come over, one Evarelst”. The artist showed him a flower piece which Pepys described as “the finest thing that ever, I think, I saw in my life; the drops of dew hanging on the leaves, so as I was forced, again and again, to put my finger to it, to feel whether my eyes were deceived or no.”

Verelst married Ann Pember at St Marylebone Parish Church, London, on 2 December 1684.

By about 1686, Verelst was displaying symptoms of mental illness. Verelst and his wife were called as witnesses in a 1692 attempt by private bill in the House of Lords by Henry Howard, 7th Duke of Norfolk, to divorce the Duchess, Mary Morduant. Verelst’s statement was read to the House but his wife’s testimony was not heard due to her apparent unreliability as a witness. The Duchess’s defence produced John Rothmell (married to Verelst’s half-sister (Note: Verelst’s half-sister was Hannah Verelst, elder child of Pieter Verelst and his second wife, Elisabeth Schölts. Her year of birth can be calculated as 1658 (between her parents' wedding and the birth of her younger sister and before her mother’s death as suggested by G.H. Veth). She would have been ten when Pieter Verelst brought the family to London in 1668. Hannah married John Rothmell, a tailor, at Holy Trinity, Minories, London, on 6 July 1679. The couple had several children of which the last recorded, Catharine, was born on 10 January 1695.)) as a witness to undermine Verelst’s evidence. Rothmell described an incident in about 1686 in which Verelst had attacked him with a sword saying that Rothmell “had disparag’d him by Marrying his Sister, and said, he would be his Death, and drew his Sword, and Commanded him to strip, that he might slash him at his pleasure”. Verelst “struck the Witness [Rothmell] above a dozen times with his Sword, and threatned still to have his Life, if he, the Witness did not fetch his Wife [who had recently given birth] down that Night, ... to bring her to be Whipt, and to bring Six Rods with him”. Rothmell also described an earlier incident when Verelst had “been Distracted for Six Weeks”, treated by a doctor and had, one cold night, “got from the Woman that watch’d him, and run about two hours in his Shirt and Wascoat [sic], in a Frosty Night, and cut his Feet, and was brought home by the Watch”.

Jacob Campo Weyerman spent time in London between 1704 and 1720 and knew Simon Verelst. Weyerman knew of Simon’s illness: “At last he went so dreadfully mad that the friends compelled him to lodge for a considerable time in a dark room furnished with fresh straw, and although he has since quite come to his senses, he has never been able to paint as before.” (Note: ”Eindelijk wiert hy zo vreeslijk gek, dat de vrienden genootzaakt waaren hem een geruime tyd te logeeren in een duyster vertrek voorzien met versch stroo, en alhoewel hij t'zedert tamelyk by zijn verstant is gekomen, echter heeft hij nooit als van te vooren konnen schilderen.”) Weyerman speaks of Verelst later being ‘nailed to the galley’, by a London art dealer, named Lovejoy. (Note: “... of liever op de galey vastgeklonken, by een Londensche Konstkooper, genaamt Lovejoy.”) This seems to be how he spent his last years, producing work of a quality inferior to his best.

The date of Verelst’s death is uncertain. There is no clear archival record of Simon Verelst’s death. Paul Taylor has suggested, using evidence from George Vertue's notebooks, that the latest date could be 1717 with a possible earlier date from 1710. Entries are given in St Martin in the Fields’ burial register for ‘Symon Evret’ on 6 December 1713 and for ‘Simon Everet’ on 14 February 1720. (Note: Simon’s wife, Ann, was probably the Anne Varels buried at St Martin in the Fields on 14 September 1713.)

Weyerman included a number of anecdotes about Verelst’s behaviour having, as their starting point, the artist’s arrogance and conceit. Verelst was encouraged by the Duke of Buckingham to undertake portraits. The resulting works were full of flowers and greeted with derision at court, including by King Charles II although, Weyerman notes, Verelst’s portraits came to be admired. Weyerman also includes the story of Verelst varnishing his hat and shoes and demanding an audience with the king. (Note: Paul Taylor notes that his story was taken by Weyerman from Mander's life of Joos van Cleef.)

Horace Walpole added to or embellished Weyerman’s anecdotes. Lord Chancellor Shaftesbury sat for Verelst who did not show proper respect for the dignitary by removing his hat. Shaftesbury was offended. Verelst responded by asking “Do you know me? I am Varelst. The king can make any man chancellor, but he can make nobody a Varelst.” Shaftesbury sat to Greenhill. Verelst called himself “God of Flowers”. He went to Whitehall in the hope of speaking to the King. His wish having been refused, he countered with: “He is king of England, I am king of painting, why should not we converse together familiarly?” Toward the end of his life, Verelst showed visitors a piece that he claimed to have been working on for twenty years, which included the styles of Raphael, Titian, Rubens and Van Dyck.

== Artistic career ==
Simon Verelst received his early training in The Hague from his father, Pieter Verelst alongside his brothers Herman Verelst and John Verelst (1648-1679). Much of their time was spent in producing flower and fruit pieces of pasteboard and paper and a collection of these works became partly the subject of a later dispute between Simon and John. Simon became a member of the Confrerie Pictura of The Hague in 1663, at the same time as his brother Herman. Pieter had been the Dean of the Confrerie in 1659-1660.

Simon’s extremely difficult financial circumstances forced him to move from The Hague to London perhaps by 1667. Samuel Pepys’s praise of one of Verelst’s flower pieces was shared with the London art world and soon he was much in demand for flower and fruit pieces. During the early 1670s, Simon Verelst was running a workshop with assistants, one of whom was his brother John who worked for or with Simon on producing pieces bearing Simon’s name, agreeing to produce no work under his own name or for others. The arrangement turned sour. Simon saw John as a competitor; John saw Simon as attempting to suppress his reputation. John claimed that Simon finished the working relationship, threatening to have him imprisoned or forced to leave England. In Easter term 1676, Simon sued John for the value of the collection of training pieces (which had been abandoned in Amsterdam several years earlier). The court awarded £500 and costs to Simon in 1677. John lived for less than two years and disappeared into obscurity while Simon’s reputation prospered. (Note: Verelst was probably a teacher of Louis Michiel (active c. 1665-after 1681).)

Weyerman wrote at length about the qualities of Simon’s still-lifes and Sam Segal and Paul Taylor both analysed his earlier flower pieces. As late as 1692, Marshall Smith praised his work: "Mr. Simon Verelst Paints Flowers estream fine, beyond any in former or present Age, for neatness".

Paul Taylor describes Verelst as having “great financial (but middling artistic) success” in portrait painting: he was said to be the highest paid artist in London at the time of his marriage in 1684. Many of his subjects moved in court circles: Charles II, James II, Mary of Modena, the Duke of Buckingham, the Duchess of Norfolk, the Duchess of Portsmouth and Nell Gwyn.

After his period of mental turmoil, Verelst’s paintings became less impressive. Some 325 paintings by the Verelsts are listed in the collection of sales catalogues from 1689-1699 held by the British Library. (Note: Some caution is required in analysing these sales. While there are 325 lots listed, these may include paintings not sold and held over to a later auction and paintings that are bought and later resold.) 79% of these paintings are listed as by “Verelst” while the others are attributed to individual: William (10%); Simon (8%); Herman (2%); John (1%). There is debate about how such large numbers of paintings were produced at relatively low cost for auctions. Peter Hancox argued that the Verelsts worked together to produce lower-valued work in large number under the name of "Verelst" while also producing higher-quality work under their own names. Certainly there is evidence that at least one of Simon’s brothers was able to talk to other artists about Simon’s technique as late as 1697.

Very little, if any, of the works of Verelst’s last years are identifiable. Arguably, after death of Herman Verelst in 1699 and of William Verelst in 1702, Simon was adrift without support. According to Weyerman, he worked for Lovejoy in The Strand but when this started and finished is unknown.

== Selected works ==
- A vase of flowers, c. 1669–1675, oil on canvas, 44 cm × 32 cm. Oxford, Ashmolean Museum, inv. WA1940.2.87.
- A vase of flowers, c. 1690–1710, oil on canvas, 106.6 cm × 88.8 cm. Cambridge, Fitzwilliam Museum, inv. PD.48-1966.
- Flowers in a vase, c. 1669, oil on wood, 26.4 cm × 22.6 cm (unframed), signed (S.V.). Cleveland, Ohio, The Cleveland Museum of Art, inv. 1982.246.
- Mary of Modena, c. 1680, oil on canvas, 125.7 cm × 102.7 cm, signed (centre left: "S, VE. J~[monogram]"). New Haven, Connecticut, Yale Center for British Art, inv. B1979.19.
- Nell Gwyn, c. 1670, oil on canvas, 93.5 cm × 74.8 cm. London, National Portrait Gallery, inv. NPG L248.
- Nell Gwyn, c. 1680, oil on canvas, 73.7 cm × 63.2 cm, signed and dated. Place, Gallery, inv. NPG 249.
- Prince Rupert of the Rhine, Count Palatine, Duke of Cumberland (1619–1682), c. 1680–1682, oil on canvas, 126.0 cm × 102.0 cm. Petworth, Petworth House and Park (National Trust), inv. NT 486254.
- Louise de Kérouaille (1649–1734), Duchess of Portsmouth, c. 1670–1680, oil on canvas, 44.5 cm × 52.1 cm. Shifnall, Weston Park, inv. 101.0019.

Prints

- Isaac Beckett, after Simon Verelst, Madam Ellen Gwinn, c. 1680-1688, mezzotint, 12.0 cm × 95.0 cm. London, British Museum, inv. P,6.210.
- Isaac Beckett, after Simon Verelst, George Villiers, 2nd Duke of Buckingham, c. 1681-1688, mezzotint, 36.5 cm × 26.6 cm. London, National Portrait Gallery, inv. NPG D1130.
- Bernard Lens after Simon Verelst, Vaas met bloemen en een vlinder, c. 1682-1725, mezzotint on paper, 34.5 cm × 24.8 cm. Amsterdam, Rijksmuseum, inv. RP-P-1904-1287.
- Robert Robinson after Simon Verelst, Flowers in a glass vase with fruit and butterflies, 1682, mezzotint on paper, 23.0 cm × 16.7 cm (sheet). New Haven, Connecticut, Yale Center for British Art, inv. B1970.3.1123.
- Peter Vanderbank, after Simon Verelst, Charlotte Lee (née Fitzroy), Countess of Lichfield, c. 1675-1700, line engraving, 37.2 cm × 27.3 cm. London, National Portrait Gallery, inv. NPG D31002.
