= Spruce Top =

Mountain in New York, United States

- Location within New York Location within the United States

Highest point
- Elevation: 3,379 ft (1,030 m)
- Coordinates: 42°09′02″N 74°10′05″W

Geography
- Location: SW of Tannersville, New York, U.S.
- Topo map: USGS Hunter

Spruce Top is a mountain located in Greene County, New York southwest of Tannersville, New York. Located to the southwest is Plateau Mountain and to the southeast is Sugarloaf Mountain. Spruce Top drains into Cook Brook and Roaring Kill, which both flow in a general northeast direction before converging with the Schoharie Creek.
