= Irish Creek (Schoharie Creek tributary) =

River of Montgomery County, New York

Location
- Country: United States
- State: New York

Physical characteristics
- Source
  - location: Montgomery County, New York
- Mouth: Schoharie Creek
  - location: Fort Hunter, Montgomery County, New York, United States
  - coordinates: 42°53′04″N 74°16′48″W
- Basin size: 3.05 mi^{2} (7.9 km^{2})

Irish Creek flows into Schoharie Creek south of Fort Hunter, New York.
