= Sarah M Couch =

America missionary in Japan with the Reformed Church of America

Sarah Maria Couch (1867–1946) was an American missionary in Japan with the Reformed Church of America. She served in Nagasaki at the Sturges Seminary – a mission school for girls – from 1892 – 1912. When the school closed, Couch stayed in Nagasaki and continued her work as a missionary. Couch retired from formal missionary work in 1937, but continued to live in Nagasaki. In 1941, Couch was arrested and detained in a Tokyo internment camp during World War II. She survived the war and returned to her home in Nagasaki, where she died in 1946.

== Early life ==
Sara Couch was born in rural New York in 1867. Her extended family owned a farm along the Schoharie Creek. Couch joined the Reformed Church of Schoharie in 1883. This was during the time of the evangelistic revivals of D. L. Moody that spread through this area of New York State. During the 1880s nearly all the members of her family died, leaving her in 1890 with only two older bachelor relatives.

== Education ==
Couch trained at the Albany Normal School and then taught at the Mechanicville School as an elementary teacher until 1891. Couch moved to Chicago to attend Moody Bible Institute (MBI). There she received mission and evangelism training. This training consisted of some Bible and theology training, as well as on the ground street evangelism in Chicago neighborhoods. While studying in Chicago, Couch applied to the Board for Foreign Missions of the Reformed Church. She received her assignment and traveled to Japan in 1892.

== Mission work ==
Upon arrival in Nagasaki, Couch was informed that instead of doing evangelism work, she would be teaching at Sturges Seminary, an English school for girls, as a last minute replacement. She continued teaching at Sturges until 1913. During her tenure at Sturges, she also became involved with the community of Nagasaki, attending Oura church. When the girls’ seminary was merged with another school over 100 miles away, Couch refused to move with the school. This was one of the few times that she refused to comply with the wishes of the mission board. She calmly and gently refused to leave Nagasaki, which took the school and mission officials by surprise. She declared that she felt called to stay in Nagasaki and continue her evangelism work there. The board complied with her request.

Couch joined forces with her former student Tomegawa Jun, who was a prominent Protestant Japanese woman. Together they organized Sunday schools, prayer groups, Bible study groups. serving women and children in the poorer Nagasaki neighborhoods. Jun and Couch wrote and distributed a newspaper together, Ochibo, which at one time had a circulation of over 1000 subscribers in Japan, and was turning a profit. Couch even occasionally spoke in church pulpits, if there was a vacancy, although preaching responsibilities generally went to Jun.

== Retirement and WWII ==
In 1937 at the age of 70, Couch officially retired from the mission board. However, she continued to live in Nagasaki, rather than returning to the United States. Even during the militarization leading up to WWII, when other US citizens were being urged to leave, she elected to stay in Nagasaki. She said that Nagasaki was her home; she had nowhere else to go. The day after the Japanese attack on Pearl Harbor, Couch was arrested and then moved later moved to an internment center in Tokyo. At the internment camp in Tokyo, she was allowed virtually no contact with the outside world. Near the end of the war, the internment camp was fire bombed by allied forces. She and the other detainees survived, but lost much of their personal property. In spite of these hardships, Couch continued to be a source of comfort to the other prisoners.

After the war ended and the internees were released, Couch was again given the opportunity to return to the US with the other camp survivors. Again she refused. She returned to Nagasaki, uncertain if Tomegawa Jun, her home or her church had survived the atomic bomb. Jun had survived as well as their home, although it was damaged, like nearly every other structure in Nagasaki. Couch continued to serve and suffer among the people of Nagasaki, believing that her time in the internment camp had made her accustomed to suffering, and more able to bear the hunger and devastation now being faced by the people of Nagasaki. Weakened by her time in the internment camp, Couch died of pneumonia in January 1946, shortly after her 79th birthday. She was buried in the Japanese cemetery in Nagasaki.
