= Schoharie Creek Bridge collapse =

1987 bridge collapse in Montgomery County, New York

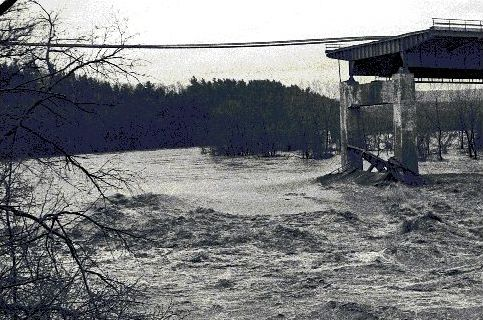
- Schoharie Creek and the remnants of the bridge following the collapse
- Date: April 5, 1987; 39 years ago
- Location: Florida, Montgomery County, New York, United States; 42°55′54″N 74°16′42″W
- Type: Bridge collapse
- Cause: Bridge scour due to flooding
- Deaths: 10

The Schoharie Creek Bridge was a New York State Thruway (I-90) bridge over the Schoharie Creek near Fort Hunter and the Mohawk River in New York State. The bridge sits adjacent to the historic Schoharie Crossing. On April 5, 1987, it collapsed due to bridge scour at the foundations after a record rainfall. The collapse killed ten people. The replacement bridge was completed and fully open to traffic on May 21, 1988.

The failure of the Schoharie Creek Bridge motivated improvement in bridge design and inspection procedures within New York and beyond.

== Bridge design and construction ==
Schoharie Creek Bridge
- Coordinates: 42°55′51″N 74°16′41″W
- Crossed: Schoharie Creek
- NYSDOT BIN: 1020940

Characteristics
- Design: Plate girder bridge
- Total length: 540 feet (160 m)
- No. of spans: 5

History
- Constructed by: B. Perini and Sons, Inc.
- Construction start: February 11, 1953
- Opened: October 1954
- Collapsed: April 5, 1987 (aged 32)

The final design for the bridge was approved in January 1952 by the New York State Department of Transportation (previously the New York State Department of Public Works). The design described a 540-foot (160 m) crossing consisting of five simply supported spans with nominal lengths of 100 feet (30.5 m), 110 feet (33.5 m), 120 feet (36.6 m), 110 feet (33.5 m), and 100 feet (30.5 m). The bridge was supported with pier frames along with abutments at each end. The pier frames were constructed of two slightly tapered columns with tie beams. The columns were fixed in place within a lightly reinforced plinth positioned on a shallow, reinforced spread footing. The spread footing was to be protected with a dry layer of riprap.

The superstructure consisted of two longitudinal main girders with transverse floor beams. The skeleton of the bridge deck (7.9 inches (200 mm) thick) was made up of steel stringers.

Construction began on February 11, 1953, by B. Perini and Sons, Inc.

== Service ==
The bridge was partially opened during the summer of 1954 before construction was completed. The Schoharie Creek Bridge (NY 1020940, New York State bridge identification number), began full service beginning in October 1954.

In the spring and summer of 1955, the pier plinths began to show vertical cracks ranging from 0.12 to 0.20 in (3 to 5 mm), as a result of high tensile stresses in the concrete plinth. Almost a year later, on October 16, 1955, the bridge was damaged by a flood. In 1957, plinth reinforcement was added to each of the four piers.

== Collapse ==
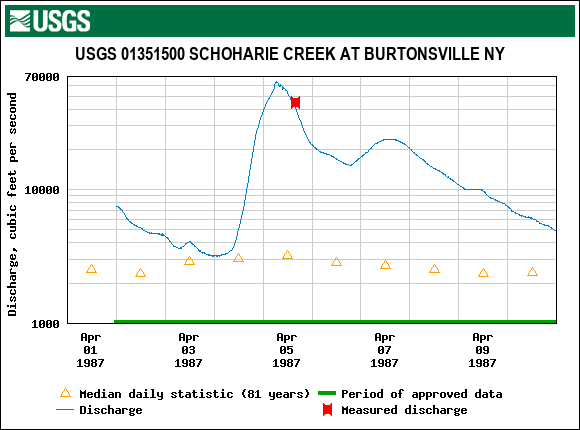
Graph from Burtonsville USGS stream gauge showing rise in discharge during bridge collapse

On the morning of April 5, 1987, during a high spring flood, the Schoharie Creek Bridge collapsed. A snowmelt combined with rainfall totaling 150 mm (5.9 in) produced an estimated 50-year flood on the creek.

Pier three was the first to collapse, which caused the progressive collapse of spans three and four. Ninety minutes later pier two and span two collapsed. Two hours later pier one and span one shifted. A National Transportation Safety Board investigation suggested that pier two collapsed because the wreckage of pier three and the two spans may have partially blocked the river, redirecting and increasing the velocity of the flow of water to pier two.

Six days later, 3.1 mi (5 km) upstream, a large section of the Mill Point Bridge collapsed. The bridge had been closed since the flood as a precaution, since inspection showed that its foundations had also been eroded.

== Casualties ==
At the time of the collapse, one car and one tractor-semitrailer were on the bridge. Before the road could be blocked off, three more cars drove into the gap. During the following three weeks, nine bodies were recovered from the river. The body of the 10th victim was recovered from the Mohawk River in July 1989.

== Failure analysis ==
Eyewitnesses observed that the third pier from the west abutment (pier three) failed first. Photos taken the day of the event show that the nose of pier three had fallen relative to its tail, which seemed to remain in position. The single concrete column at the nose of pier three lost support, causing that column to buckle and the two spans supported by pier three to fall into the swollen creek. A short while later, eyewitnesses watched as the second pier from the west abutment failed. An on-site news team recorded this event on video tape. The video showed a sudden and catastrophic drop at the tail-end of the second pier. This caused the span immediately west of pier two to also fall into the creek.

Because of the high profile of this catastrophe and loss of life, the National Transportation Safety Board started investigations in the immediate aftermath of the failure. The New York State Thruway Authority hired a consortium made up of staff from Wiss, Janney, Elstner Associates, Inc., and Mueser Rutledge Consulting Engineers to lead the investigation on their behalf. Divers began removing steel from the river bed after the water levels receded. Construction of a cofferdam around portions of the site allowed de-watering. Investigations showed significant local erosion of the stream bed that occurred before the failure and likely additional scour due to the obstructive nature of the bridge decks that fell into the creek after the failure. The nose of pier three laid in a large asymmetrical horseshoe-shaped scour hole. The observed failure of the downstream (tail) end of pier two added confusion to the causative analysis.

To study the causes of the failure, the investigating engineering team commissioned a physical model study at the hydraulics laboratory at Colorado State University. A physical hydraulic model of the regional flow field constructed at a non-distorted scale of 1:50 using clear water and sand bed allowed observation of the failure progression. The Schoharie Creek makes an approximate 120-degree bend to the left looking downstream towards the bridge site. Measurements of the flow field approaching the bridge model showed that the maximum velocity coincided with the location of pier three, the pier with significant submergence closest to the outside of the bend. The model study clearly showed that once the flat face of the pier three spread footing was exposed to the flow, it generated a large horseshoe vortex that accentuated local scour around the pier nose. Secondary flow naturally occurs when a river flows around a bend. Higher velocity flow, which has higher momentum, resists the curvature of the river bend and moves towards the outside bank. Since this flow exists near the water surface, it causes flow near the bed to move towards the inside of the bend. As a result, the flow near the bed of the river channel at the bridge opening had an angle relative to the alignment of pier 3. This led to a component of velocity near the stream bed moving from pier 3 towards pier 2. A second physical hydraulic model constructed at a scale of 1:15 with the appropriate angle of attack relative to the axis of pier 3 allowed detailed phenomenological study of the scour process.

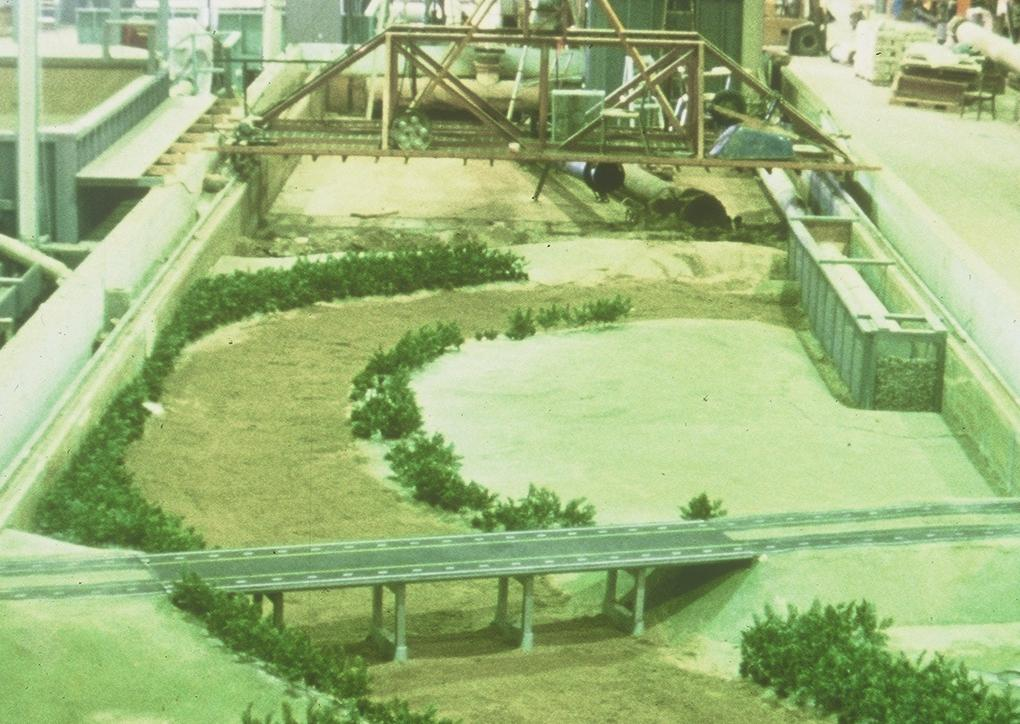
1:50 scale, non-distorted, sand-bed, physical hydraulic model constructed to study the suspected pier scour failure mechanism of the Schoharie Creek Bridge in 1987 at Colorado State University. View looking upstream.

The investigations concluded that the bridge collapsed due to extensive scour under pier three. Results from the physical hydraulic model studies showed that once the flat nose of the spread footing became exposed to the flow, an intense horseshoe vortex exhumed bed material from the nose of that pier. Once the scour depth at the nose of the pier exceeded the depth of the spread footing, undermining began. Because of the angle of attack created by the secondary flow, scour preferentially affected the right-hand portion of the pier as eroded bed material swept downstream. With each successive increment of undermining, which progressed from the nose of the pier towards the tail, the upper portion of the plinth experienced increasing tension. Evidence from post-event analysis of the dewatered site suggested that undermining of the pier three spread footing was extensive, well in excess of 50 percent of its length, when the plinth suddenly failed. This allowed the nose of pier three to drop into the scour hole. The simple-span bridge design had no ability to resist the resulting lateral load on the unsupported column, leading to sudden, catastrophic and progressive collapse of both spans supported by pier 3.

The original design of the bridge specified abandonment in place of steel sheet piling installed during construction to stabilize the construction site at piers 2 and 3. This would have protected those piers from scour, but was not done. The foundation of the pier was bearing on erodible soil, consisting of layers of gravel, sand and silt, inter-bedded with folded and tilted till. This allowed high velocity flood waters to penetrate the bearing stratum. The area left around the footing was not filled with riprap stone, but instead was back-filled with erodible soil and topped off with dry riprap. Riprap protection, inspection, and maintenance were determined to have been inadequate.

The investigations showed that the scouring process under the piers began shortly after the bridge was built. At the time of the collapse, the upstream end of pier 3 fell into a scour hole approximately 9.8 feet (3 m) deep. Investigators estimated that about 25 to 30 feet (7.5 to 9 m) of the pier was undermined.

Another factor that contributed to the failure was the weight of the riprap used in the construction. The design specification called for riprap with 50 percent of the stones heavier than 1.3 kilonewtons (290 lb_{f}), and the remainder between 0.44 and 1.3 kN (99 and 292 lb_{f}). Investigators found that heavier riprap weights of 4.4 to 6.7 kN (990 to 1,510 lb_{f}) should have been specified.

Other considerations as to the cause of the collapse included design of the superstructure, quality of materials and construction, and inspection and maintenance. Investigations found that these factors did not contribute to the collapse.

Twelve hours before the Schoharie Creek Bridge collapsed due to heavy rainfall, the rush of water through the Blenheim-Gilboa Pumped Storage Power Project 40 miles (64 km) upstream hit a historic high. To cope with the overload, the dam released water into the Schoharie Creek according to the rate at which it was entering the reservoir from upstream, adding to the load in the creek.

== See also ==
- List of bridge disasters
- Bridge scour
