= Schoharie Crossing State Historic Site =

- Erie Canal
- U.S. National Register of Historic Places
- U.S. National Historic Landmark
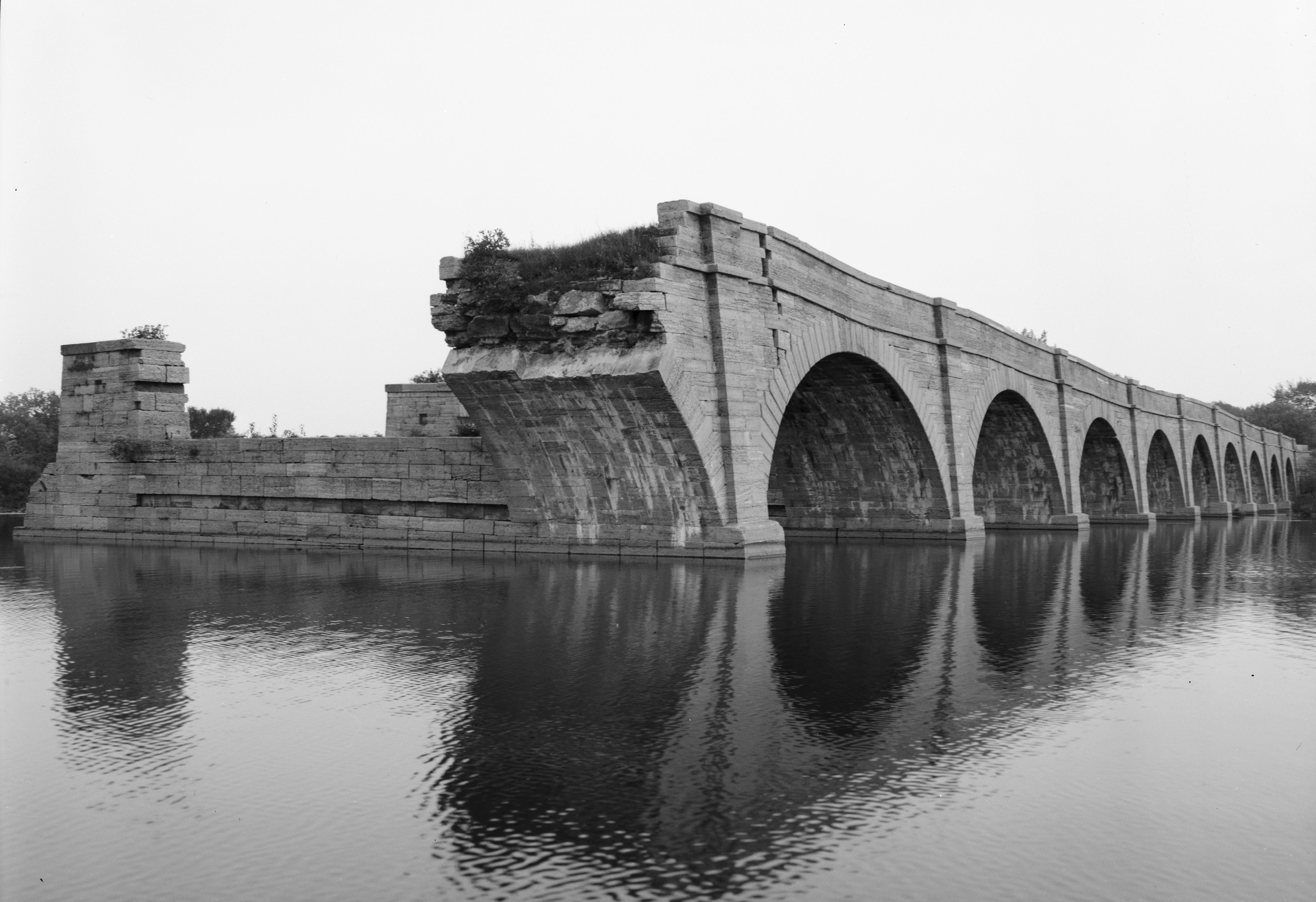
- Nine remaining arches of the Schoharie Creek Aqueduct with the towpath on the right and the remains of the canal crossing on the left

- Location within New York
- Nearest city: Fort Hunter, New York
- Coordinates: 42°56′22.65″N 74°17′10.62″W
- Built: 1841–1845
- NRHP reference No.: 66000530

Significant dates
- Added to NRHP: October 15, 1966
- Designated NHL: October 9, 1960

Schoharie Crossing State Historic Site, also known as Erie Canal National Historic Landmark, is a historic district that includes the ruins of the Erie Canal aqueduct over Schoharie Creek, and a 3.5-mile (5.6 km) long part of the Erie Canal, in the towns of Glen and Florida within Montgomery County, New York. It was the first part of the old canal to be designated a National Historic Landmark, prior to the designation of the entire New York State Barge Canal as an NHL in 2017.

== History ==
=== Tiononderoge and Fort Hunter ===
Located at the south east corner of the confluence of the Mohawk River and Schoharie Creek was the Mohawk fortified village of Tiononderoge or Teiontontaroka. The name is Mohawk meaning "the meeting of the waters". The settlement was occupied from around 1710 to the beginning of the American Revolutionary War in 1776. It has been estimated that approximately 360 people lived in the village in 1713, declining to 204 by 1750. Europeans called the village the Lower Castle from its position as the major eastern settlement (furthest downstream) of the Mohawk.

Fort Hunter and Queen Anne's Chapel

In 1710, Peter Schuyler, mayor of Albany, invited three Mohawk chiefs and one Mahican chief (of the Algonquian-speaking peoples) to travel to England and visit Queen Anne to solidify their trading alliance. The Mohawk chiefs asked for help in defense against the French, including Anglican missionaries to offset French Catholic influence among their people. Numerous Catholic Mohawk had moved up to the St. Lawrence River valley, where they settled south of Montreal at a village they named Kahnawake, after their former Caughnawaga in the Mohawk Valley.

The Mohawk offered help in settling Palatine German refugees in New York, who had arrived that year and were working in English camps along the Hudson River. Hendrick Tejonihokarawa offered Mohawk land near the Schoharie. Later it was offered to the Germans through Governor Hunter, and some settled in the Schoharie Valley.

As a result of the Mohawk request for aid, Queen Anne authorized Schuyler to build Fort Hunter, named after Colonial Governor Robert Hunter; the complex was completed in 1712, located near where Schoharie Creek entered the Mohawk River. The fort was 150-foot square with a blockhouse at each corner. The main gate faced north. A wooden chapel was built at the center. The chapel was named after Queen Anne, who sent communion silver and other items to furnish it.

In 1741, Queen Anne's Chapel was rebuilt using limestone blocks that were quarried locally. By 1775, colonists estimated 600 "praying Indians" (Christians) lived at Fort Hunter.

Shortly thereafter, fighting broke out in the Mohawk Valley and across the colonies as part of the American Revolution. The Mohawks sided with England, as they had for the previous century in conflicts with the French. Fighting alongside the British at the Battle of Oriskany and the Battle of Freeman's Farm, many of the Mohawk soon became disgusted with the British management of the conflicts and left to join their cousins, the Turtle clan, in the Saint Lawrence Valley.

In 1780, Mohawk warriors joined Sir John Johnson and Joseph Brant in fighting against the rebellious colonists in the Mohawk Valley. They participated in raids known as the "Burning of the Valleys". During one of the raids, a group of men retrieved Queen Anne's gifts, which had been buried at Fort Hunter. Today they are displayed at Brantford and Tyendinaga, Ontario, Canada.

After the American Revolutionary War, Queen Anne's Chapel was used for a time as a tavern and stable, to house the many migrants at Fort Hunter, which had developed into a village. They were moving west along the valley into areas of New York state newly opened for European-American settlement since the Iroquois, as allies of the British, were forced to cede their lands after the British defeat. The chapel was torn down during the construction of the Erie Canal, which was completed in 1825.

In 1957 and 1958 a group of Mohawks from Kanawake set up an encampment at Schorarie Creek after being displaced by the St. Lawrence Seaway project. According to Chief Standing Arrow, the land along the Schorarie had been ceded to the Mohawk in the Treaty of Fort Stanwix (1784) in exchange for lands in the Ohio Valley, and illegally sold to settlers. The private landowner and the New York State Thruway objected to the settlement. It was abandoned after the Mohawks lost their case in court and were evicted.

=== Original Erie Canal ===
Construction for the Erie Canal was begun on July 4, 1817 in Rome, New York. Within six years the section of the canal through Fort Hunter was completed (1822).

The canal originally crossed through the creek in a slack water pool that was created by a log and stone dam. Remnants of which can be seen when the water is low, further down the creek. Boats would then be towed across while mules and horses were ferried. A towpath bridge was later built to help mules cross but the boats still had to make the dangerous crossing.

The East Guard Lock and Original Erie Canal Prism remain at Schoharie Crossing State Historic Site

Schoharie Crossing State Historic Site is one of the only sites where the Original Erie Canal remains. It runs from the Schoharie Creek to the Enlarged Erie Canal Lock 29 - also known as Empire Lock. Along the way are some significant features.

- A guard lock was constructed on the east side of the Schoharie Creek. This lock did not raise the level of the canal but rather protected the canal banks from high and often tumultuous waters in the Schoharie Creek. The Fort Hunter guard lock is the only guard lock that survives from the original canal. Folk lore states that the lock was built using the limestone blocks from Queen Anne's Chapel, which was razed to make way for the canal.
- Further down the canal, near the Enlarged Erie Canal Lock 29, is the Original Erie Canal Lock 20. Lock 20 is the only lift lock that survives from the original canal. Though carefully filled in during the early 1980s to avoid total collapse of the stonework, this lock demonstrates the dimensions as well as situation of the original canal in reference to the Enlarged Erie Canal.

Both Lock 20 and the guard lock were filled with gravel in 1980 to stabilize them.

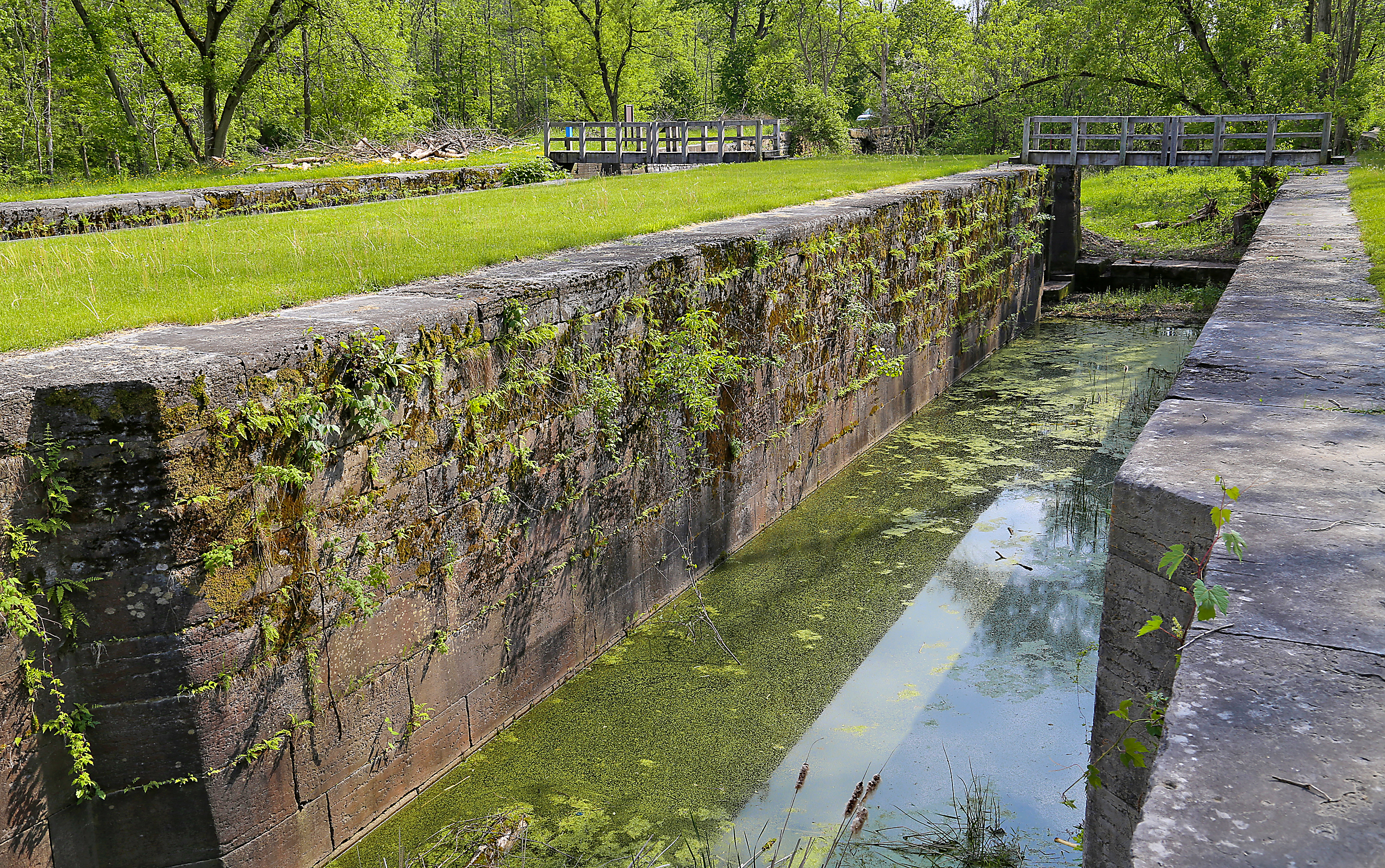
A view of Empire Lock 29 from the Enlarged Era Erie Canal.

=== Enlarged Erie Canal ===
Soon after the original Erie Canal was completed, traffic outgrew it. By the 1830s, it was decided that the entire length would have to be enlarged to keep up with growing trade. The Enlarged Erie Canal construction era lasted from 1836 to 1862. During this time the overall length of the canal was reduced as well as number of locks. The canal locks were "doubled" - meaning that two chambers were constructed side by side.

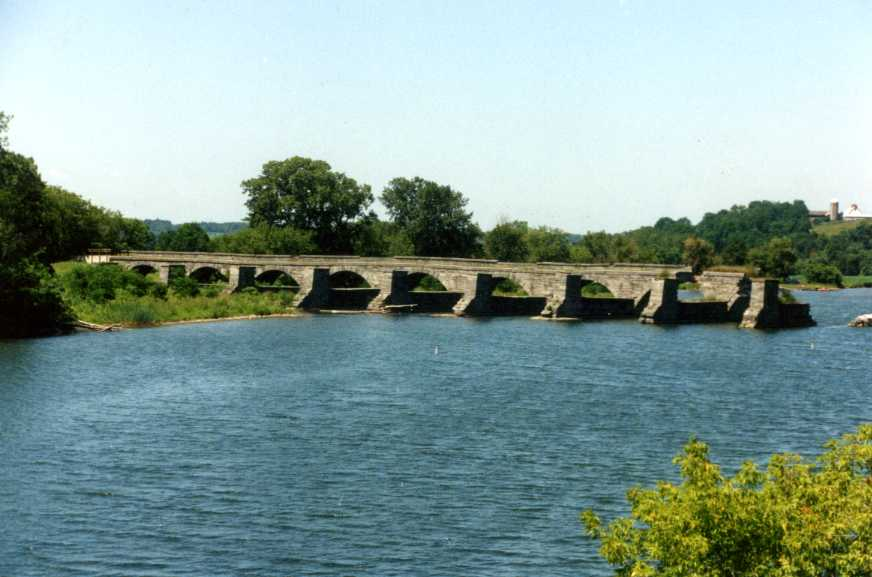
Schoharie Aqueduct, showing the canalway

In Fort Hunter, the path of the canal was moved so that an aqueduct could be constructed across Schoharie Creek. Construction began on the Schoharie Aqueduct in 1839 by Otis Eddy and was completed in 1841. Fourteen arches spanning 624 feet carried the Enlarged Erie Canal and towpath across the Schoharie Creek from 1845 until 1916.

In the 1940s, the Army Corps of Engineers demolished the easternmost six arches of the aqueduct to alleviate ice jams. A seventh arch collapsed during a 1977 flood, and an eighth collapsed on August 16, 1998. Six arches remain standing today.

The aqueduct was named a National Historic Landmark in 1960.

The Schoharie Creek Aqueduct is on the Preservation League of NYS "Seven to Save" list for 2018-2019.

Putman's Canal Store with Lock 28, also known as "Yankee Hill" Lock, of the Enlarged Erie Canal in front.

The Schoharie Crossing State Historic Site includes many other remnants of the Enlarged Erie Canal.

"Yankee Hill" Lock 28 and Putman's Canal Store are located off of Queen Anne Street. The lock was built during the enlargement in the 1840s. Putman's was built in 1856 by the family of Garrett Putman and was used as a canal store through the early 1900s. There is a small exhibit inside the building about canal stores of the era.

"Empire" Lock 29 is located just east of East Church Street in Fort Hunter. It was constructed in the 1840s by James Ott and is one of the best preserved locks from the enlarged Erie Canal.

Lock 30 was built by James Stewart in the 1840s. In 1956, the lock was filled in and paved over to make way for an adjustment to Main Street.

=== Schoharie Crossing State Historic Site ===
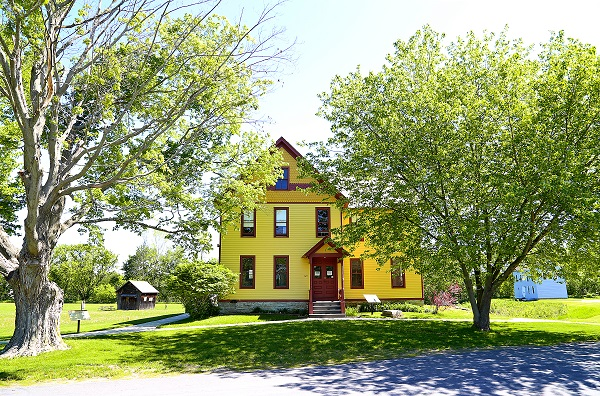
Schoharie Crossing's Visitor Center is located on the east bank of the Schoharie Creek in Fort Hunter.

The Fort Hunter Canal Society was formed in the 1950s to preserve the ruins of the Erie Canal in Fort Hunter.

In 1966, the state-owned land at Fort Hunter was transferred to the New York State Office of Parks, Recreation and Historic Preservation and Schoharie Crossing State Historic Site was formed.

Throughout the years, many changes, additions, and improvements have been made.

The Visitor Center - which opened in 1987 - is located at 129 Schoharie Street in Fort Hunter, Montgomery County, New York. When the parking lot was put in, remains of a stone wall were uncovered. The remains were believed to be associated with the original Fort Hunter and Queen Anne's Chapel. During the flooding caused by Hurricane Irene in 2011, the parking lot was washed away, revealing the foundation for the mid-18th century Fort Hunter.

A new exhibit in the Visitor Center, "Pathway to Empire: How the Erie Canal Helped Build America" opened in 2018 to mark the celebration of the canal's bicentennial. The permanent exhibit at the site interprets the history of the Erie Canal as well as Fort Hunter. It brings visitors through the progression of the canal system in New York from concept to construction and on to modern usage. Restrooms and a gift shop are located here.

Yankee Hill Lock Picnic area is located on Queen Anne Street by Lock 28 and Putman's Canal Store.

A boat launch and picnic area are located at the end of Dufel Road on the west side of the Schoharie Creek.

== See also ==
- Mohawk Upper Castle Historic District
- Schoharie Creek Bridge collapse, a modern era example of the power of Schoharie Creek
- List of bridges documented by the Historic American Engineering Record in New York (state)
- List of National Historic Landmarks in New York
- List of New York State Historic Sites
