= Stony Creek (Line Creek tributary) =

Location
- Country: United States
- State: New York

Physical characteristics
- Mouth: Line Creek
  - location: Middleburgh, New York, United States
  - coordinates: 42°37′42″N 74°24′33″W
- Basin size: 1.81 mi^{2} (4.7 km^{2})

Stony Creek converges with Line Creek by Middleburgh, New York.
