= Gooseberry Creek =

Location
- Country: United States
- State: New York

Physical characteristics
- Source
  - location: Greene County, New York
- Mouth: Schoharie Creek
  - location: Tannersville, Greene County, New York, United States
  - coordinates: 42°11′11″N 74°09′49″W

Gooseberry Creek flows into Schoharie Creek by Tannersville, New York.
