= Johnson Hollow Brook =

- Location of the mouth of Johnson Hollow Brook

Location
- Country: United States
- State: New York
- County: Delaware

Physical characteristics
- Source
  - coordinates: 42°18′10″N 74°29′34″W
- Mouth: Schoharie Creek
  - coordinates: 42°20′03″N 74°26′25″W
  - elevation: 1,129 ft (344 m)

Johnson Hollow Brook is a river in Delaware County, New York. It flows into the Schoharie Creek northwest of Prattsville.
