= Hendrick Tejonihokarawa =

Mohawk chief (1660–1735)

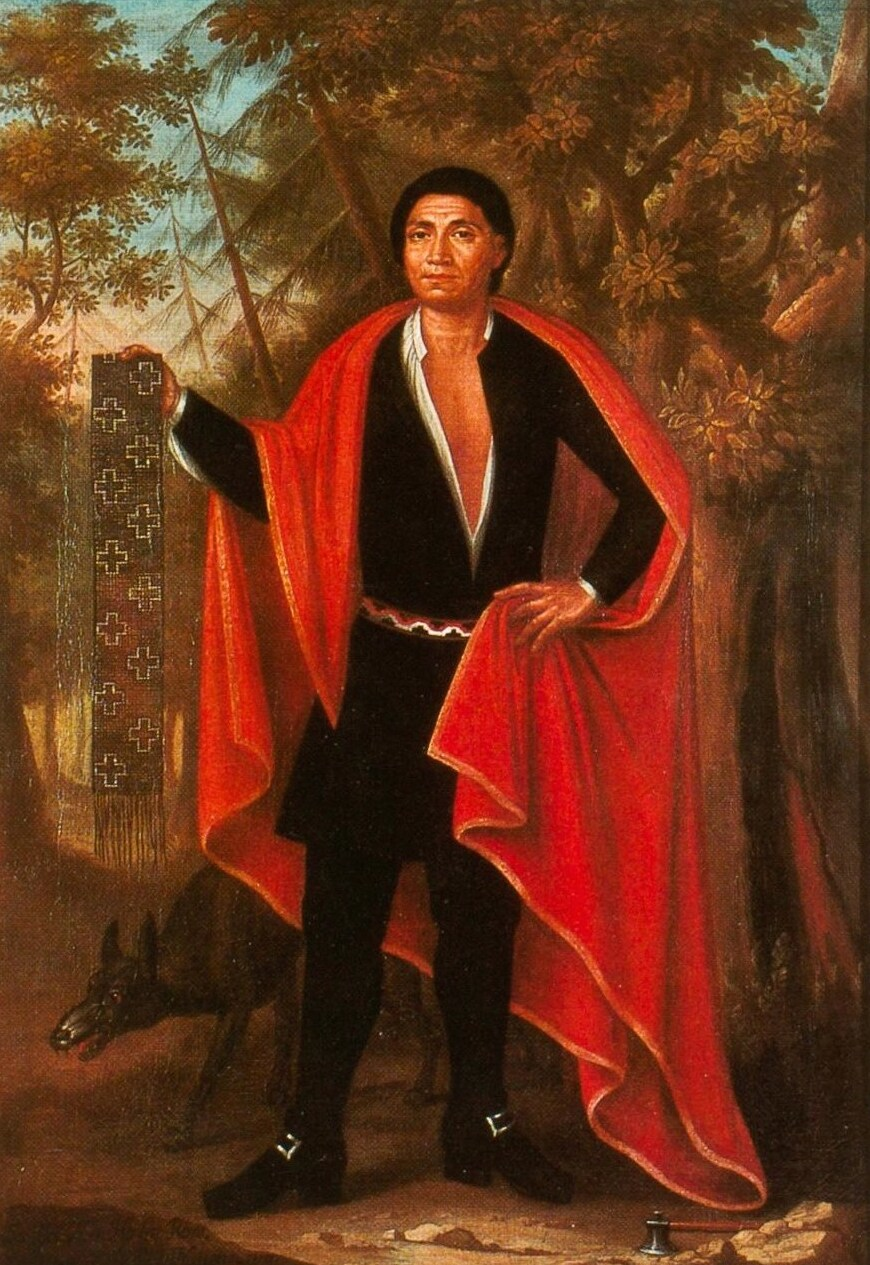
- John Verelst's 1710 portrait, "Tee-Yee-Neen-Ho-Ga-Row, Emperor of the Six Nations." (National Archives of Canada - Artist: John Verelst C-092421, C-092419, C-092417, C-092415)
- Pronunciation: Tay yon' a ho ga rau' a
- Born: c. 1660
- Died: c.1735 (aged 74–75)
- Other names: Tee Yee Neen Ho Ga Row; Hendrick Peters
- Occupation: Mohawk Royaner

Hendrick Tejonihokarawa, also known as Tee-Yee-Neen-Ho-Ga-Row, Hendrick Peters, and King Hendrick (c. 1660 – c. 1735) was a Mohawk Wolf Clan Royaner ("sachem"), lay preacher and Six Nations diplomat from the Province of New York.

While Tejonihokarawa spent much of his early life as a warrior, his conversion to Christianity and association with the Anglican Church led to many diplomatic opportunities. He was one of the Four Mohawk Kings who travelled to London in 1710 to meet with Anne, Queen of Great Britain and her court to mark a treaty with Great Britain. The chiefs requested the Queen's help in countering French influence in New York and asked for English missionaries to help their people offset French Catholic influence. The Mohawk diplomacy helped the Haudenosaunee preserve their power through the colonial years.

Tejonihokarawa's diplomatic career faded by the 1730s, a period when Hendrick Theyanoguin entered use in British sources, as a result, their identities have frequently been conflated by historians.

== Early Life ==
Tejonihokarawa was born around 1660 to and unknown mother, and a possibly Mahican father, ascending into his mother's Wolf Clan through matrilineal kinship. He lived in the lower village at Fort Hunter, then known as Tionondoroge.

The English translation of his name is "doorkeeper," "door opener" or "open the door," suggesting he may have had the responsibility for opening the longhouse door to receive visitors, and is equivalent to the title of a Seneca Royaner, suggesting he was a metaphorical 'doorkeeper' to the league of the Haudenosaunee. His name is alternatively spelt Teoniahigarawe, Teyohninhohakara:wenh, Thonnenhokarawa, or Tejonagarawe. He was described by Malvina Bolus as being six feet tall, handsome, and well proportioned.

He is believed to have acquired the name Hendrick Peters in July 1690, when he was baptized by Dutch missionary Godfridius Dellius as a member of the Dutch Reformed Church. Tejonihokarawa would go on to become a Protestant preacher, visiting Catholic Mohawks in Canada in 1697, and later accusing Dellius and Peter Schuyler of an illegal land patent. Despite his ties to Western settlers, and later support of the British, Tejonihokarawa never spoke substantial English.

In 1701, Tejonihokarawa was a signatory on a document that granted William III 800 square miles of Iroquois hunting grounds, signing his name "Teoniahigarawe." In 1709, he was persuaded to recruit Mohawk warriors for Francis Nicholson's planned attack on Canada.

== Diplomatic Career ==
By 1710, Tejonihokarawa may have been selected by matrilineage as one of three Wolf Clan royaner, probably with the title Sharenhó:wane, (Note: Often anglicized as Sharenhowaneh) a title he held alongside his others, but did not ostensibly use.

=== 1710 Visit to London ===
Peter Schuyler, Francis Nicholson and Samuel Vetch invited Tejonihokarawa, as well as Cenelitonoro (John), Sagayonguaroughton (Brant Throwariage), and another Mohawk Royaner to London to meet with Queen Anne. The delegation sought to lobby support for a renewed assault on New France, emphasising the support of the Iroquois. During their visit to London, the four Kings posed for a portrait by John Verelst, which displays a Wolf at Tejonihokarawa's heel, indicating his affiliation to the Wolf Clan. He also sat for portraits by John Faber the Elder, and Bernard Lens III.

While in London, Tejonihokarawa requested Anglican missionaries to help offset French Catholic influence in Haudenosaunee territory. After the French severely damaged Mohawk villages in 1666, they had forced the people to accept Catholic Jesuits as missionaries. The Jesuits soon set up a mission at the Mohawk town of Ossernenon, a few miles west of Schoharie Creek near modern Auriesville, New York. They had been working to recruit Mohawk converts in present-day New York. Numerous converted Mohawk had migrated to the St. Lawrence River area, settling at the mission village of Kahnawake south of Montreal. Anglican missionaries established a mission and chapel at Fort Hunter in 1711.

Furthermore, Queen Anne had asked Tejonihokarawa for help resettling Palatine German refugees living in the Hudson Valley. They had been working at English camps in the Hudson Valley to pay off their passage to the colony and wanted their own lands. Through Governor Robert Hunter, Tejonihokarawa offered Mohawk land in his territory to the refugees, some of whom took land near Schoharie Creek in the Autumn of 1712.

=== Return to New York ===
In November 1712, Tejonihokarawa, Taragiorus and three other Royaner visited Albany, to meet with the Reverend William Andrews, who was sent by Queen Anne and the Archbishop of Canterbury. Tejonihokarawa served as a lay preacher during this time, moving to Albany and taking up residency near the chapel. During this time, Conrad Weiser settled nearby and began to learn the Mohawk language, it is unclear if they met.

Tejonihokarawa was deposed by Wolf Clan Mothers in the winter of 1712-13, due to his belief that the appointment of Andrews was a mistake, and his objection to tithing all incomes to the chapel. In June 1719, Andrews resigned his post as missionary at Fort Hunter, leading to Tejonihokarawa's restoration as Royaner by 1720.

Tejonihokarawa led a peacemaking expedition to Massachusetts and Maine in 1722, seeking to act as middlemen between Abenakis and New Englanders, advocating for participation in the Covenant Chain. By 1727, the mission at Fort Hunter was reestablished.

== Death ==
Tejonihokarawa appears less frequently in British sources after 1730, and much of the events of his later life remain unknown. He died sometime after April 1735, possibly surviving into the early 1740s.

== Gallery ==
Bernard Lens the younger (1682-1725), The Four Indian Kings, Mezzotint

Print after John Verlast

== See also ==
- Joseph Brant
- Four Mohawk Kings
- Covenant Chain

== Sources ==
- Eric Hinderaker, The Two Hendricks: Unraveling a Mohawk Mystery. Cambridge, Massachusetts: Harvard University Press, 2010.
- Barbara J. Sivertsen, Turtles, Wolves, and Bears: A Mohawk Family History (1996), reprint Heritage Books, 2007
- Snow, Dean R. "Searching for Hendrick: Correction of a Historic Conflation". New York History, Summer 2007
