= Stony Brook (Schoharie Creek tributary) =

Location
- Country: United States
- State: New York

Physical characteristics
- Source
  - location: Schoharie County, New York
- Mouth: Schoharie Creek
  - location: Schoharie, Schoharie County, New York, United States
  - coordinates: 42°38′55″N 74°19′43″W
- Basin size: 4.2 mi^{2} (11 km^{2})

Stony Brook flows into Schoharie Creek by Schoharie, New York.
