= Panther Creek (Schoharie Creek tributary) =

Panther Creek Panther Kil
- Location of mouth within New York Panther Creek (Schoharie Creek tributary) (the United States)
- Native name: Kehanagwara

Location
- Country: United States
- State: New York
- Region: Catskill Mountains
- County: Schoharie

Physical characteristics
- Source: Rossman Pond
  - location: Schoharie County, New York
  - coordinates: 42°35′40″N 74°31′43″W
- Mouth: Schoharie Creek
  - location: Breakabeen
  - coordinates: 42°32′56″N 74°24′24″W
  - elevation: 682 ft (208 m)
- Basin size: 27.2 sq mi (70 km^{2})

Basin features
- Progression: Panther Creek → Schoharie Creek → Mohawk River → Hudson River → Upper New York Bay
- Tributaries
  - left: House Creek
- Waterfalls: Boucks Falls

Panther Creek is a river in Schoharie County in the state of New York. It flows into the Schoharie Creek by Breakabeen.

== History ==
In the 1700s and earlier, a main Indian trail began in Middleburgh and followed the Schoharie Creek upstream to Panther Creek. It then followed Panther to its source and continued on over the ridge to Summit Lake. The trail then followed Charlotte Creek from the lake and ended at the Susquehanna River.

== Hydrology ==
=== Water quality ===
In 2005, a biological assessment of the creek was performed in Breakabeen by State Route 30. Results of the tests showed non-impacted conditions, which are consistent with a previous test conducted in 2000 at this site. DEC rates the water quality of the stream as Class C, suitable for fishing and non-contact human recreation. The agency also adds a "(TS)", indicating that the stream's waters are ideal for trout spawning.

=== Flood control ===
The bridge over the creek on West Fulton Road (County Route 4) is prone to debris jams and overflowing during flood events. This is due to the undersized span and the height above the creek. There is a low spot on West Fulton Road slightly east of the bridge, that during a 25-year and higher flood, would overtop the right bank of the creek and flow over the low spot in the road.
