= Heathen Creek =

Location
- Country: United States
- State: New York

Physical characteristics
- Mouth: House Creek
  - location: West Fulton, New York, United States
  - coordinates: 42°35′52″N 74°28′19″W
- Basin size: 3.01 mi^{2} (7.8 km^{2})

Heathen Creek converges with House Creek by West Fulton, New York.
