= Keyser Kill =

Location
- Country: United States
- State: New York

Physical characteristics
- Source
  - location: Schoharie County, New York
- Mouth: Schoharie Creek
  - location: Breakabeen, New York, Schoharie County, New York, United States
  - coordinates: 42°31′26″N 74°24′03″W
- Basin size: 15.9 mi^{2} (41 km^{2})

Keyser Kill flows into Schoharie Creek near Breakabeen, New York.
