= John Chase Brook =

- Location of the mouth of John Chase Brook John Chase Brook (the United States)

Location
- Country: United States
- State: New York
- County: Greene

Physical characteristics
- Source
  - location: Greene County, New York
- Mouth: Schoharie Creek
  - location: Jewett Center, Greene County, New York, United States
  - coordinates: 42°14′33″N 74°20′04″W
- Basin size: 2.99 sq mi (7.7 km^{2})

John Chase Brook is a river in Greene County in the state of New York. It flows into Schoharie Creek by Jewett Center.
