= Mine Kill =

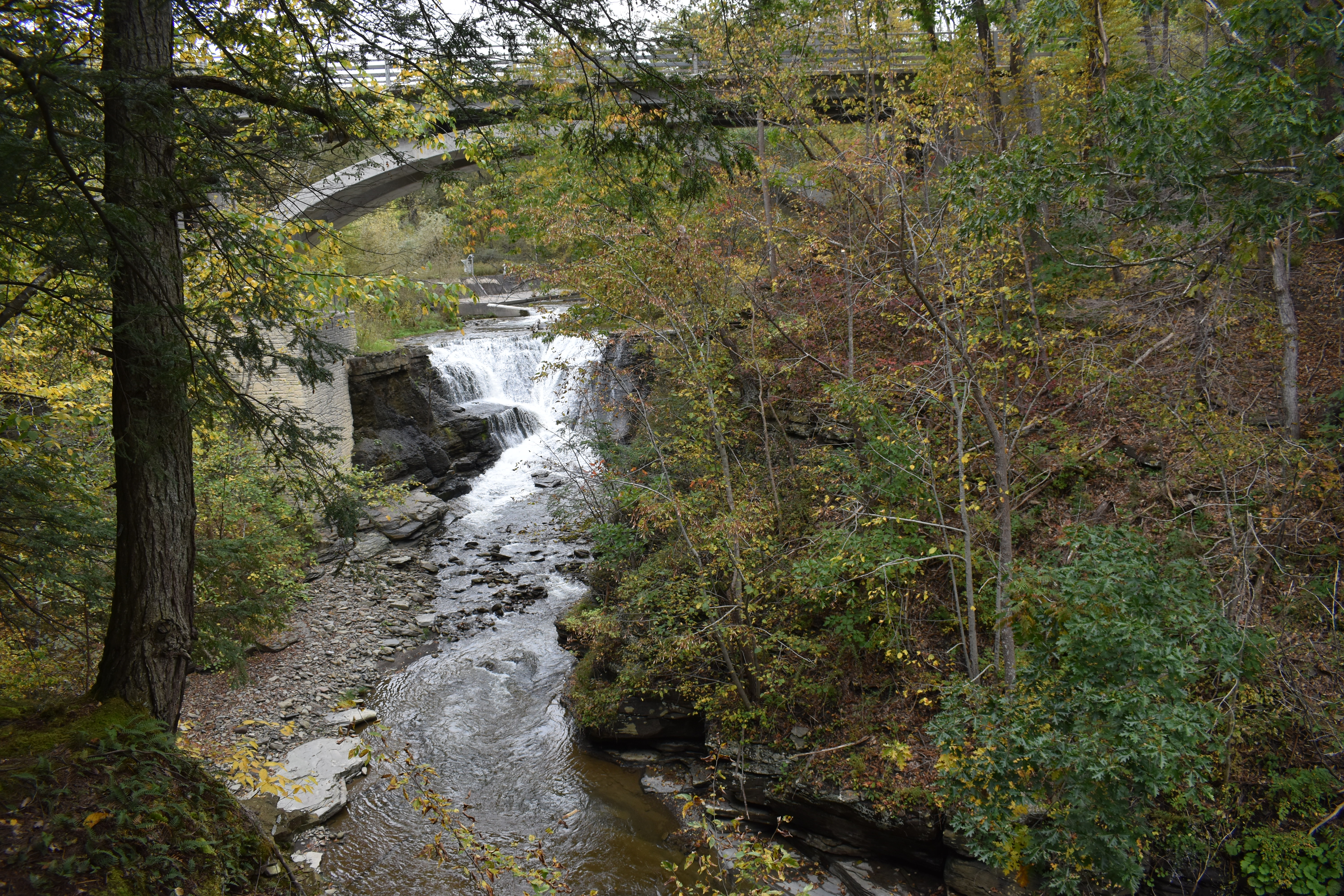
- Mine Kill Falls in October 2021

- Location of mouth within New York Mine Kill (the United States)

Location
- Country: United States
- State: New York
- Region: Central New York
- County: Schoharie

Physical characteristics
- Source
  - location: East-southeast of Jefferson
  - coordinates: 42°28′19″N 74°34′55″W
- Mouth: Schoharie Creek
  - location: North of Gilboa
  - coordinates: 42°25′54″N 74°27′45″W
- Basin size: 17.7 sq mi (46 km^{2})

Basin features
- Progression: Mine Kill → Schoharie Creek → Mohawk River → Hudson River → Upper New York Bay
- Waterfalls: Mine Kill Falls

Mine Kill is a river in Schoharie County in the state of New York. It flows into the Schoharie Creek by Gilboa, New York. Mine Kill Falls is located on the creek where it passes under State Route 30.

== Hydrology ==
The United States Geological Survey (USGS) maintains one stream gauge along Mine Kill. The station is located .6 miles (0.97 km) upstream from the mouth, three miles (4.8 km) southwest of North Blenheim, had a maximum discharge of 2,550 cubic feet (72 m^{3}) per second on January 19, 1996, and a minimum discharge of 0.1 cubic feet (0.0028 m^{3}) per second on August 27–30, 1980.
