= Line Creek (Schoharie Creek tributary) =

Location
- Country: United States
- State: New York

Physical characteristics
- Source
  - location: Schoharie County, New York
- Mouth: Schoharie Creek
  - location: Middleburgh, Schoharie County, New York, United States
  - coordinates: 42°35′25″N 74°20′39″W
- Basin size: 9.08 mi^{2} (23.5 km^{2})

Basin features
- Tributaries
  - right: Stony Creek

Line Creek is a river that flows into the Schoharie Creek by Middleburgh, New York.
