= Bowman Creek (Schoharie Creek tributary) =

Location
- Country: United States
- State: New York

Physical characteristics
- Source
  - location: Schenectady County, New York
- Mouth: Schoharie Creek
  - location: Burtonsville, Schenectady County, New York, United States
  - coordinates: 42°48′11″N 74°15′29″W
- Basin size: 3.1 mi^{2} (8.0 km^{2})

Bowman Creek flows into Schoharie Creek by Burtonsville, New York.
