= Little Schoharie Creek =

- Location of mouth within New York Little Schoharie Creek (the United States)

Location
- Country: United States
- State: New York
- Counties: Schoharie, Albany

Physical characteristics
- Source
  - location: East of Huntersland
  - coordinates: 42°33′42″N 74°11′40″W
- Mouth: Schoharie Creek
  - location: Middleburgh
  - coordinates: 42°35′31″N 74°20′32″W
  - elevation: 617 ft (188 m)
- Basin size: 24.5 sq mi (63 km^{2})

Basin features
- Progression: Little Schoharie Creek → Schoharie Creek → Mohawk River → Hudson River → Upper New York Bay

Little Schoharie Creek is a river in Schoharie and Albany counties in the state of New York. It converges with the Schoharie Creek in Middleburgh.

== Hydrology ==
=== Discharge ===
The United States Geological Survey (USGS) maintains stream gauges along Little Schoharie Creek. The station by Middleburgh in operation since December 2017, 1.6 miles (2.6 km) upstream from the mouth, had a maximum discharge of 442 cubic feet (12.5 m^{3}) per second on April 16, 2018, and a minimum discharge of 0.75 cubic feet (0.021 m^{3}) per second on July 21, 2018.
