= John Verelst =

English portrait painter (c. 1670–1734)

- Born: c. 1670
- Died: 7 March 1734; London
- Resting place: St Christopher le Stocks
- Occupation: portrait painter
- Notable work: portraits of the Four Mohawk Kings
- Spouse: Anne Verelst (née Tureng)
- Parents: Herman Verelst (father); Cecilia Verelst (née Fend) (mother)
- Relatives: Pieter Verelst (grandfather); Simon Verelst (uncle); John Verelst (1648–1679) (uncle); William Verelst (1651–1702) (uncle); Lodvick Verelst (brother); Michael Verelst (brother); Adriana Verelst (sister); William Verelst (1704-1752) (son); Harry Verelst (colonial governor) (grandson)

Three unknown men
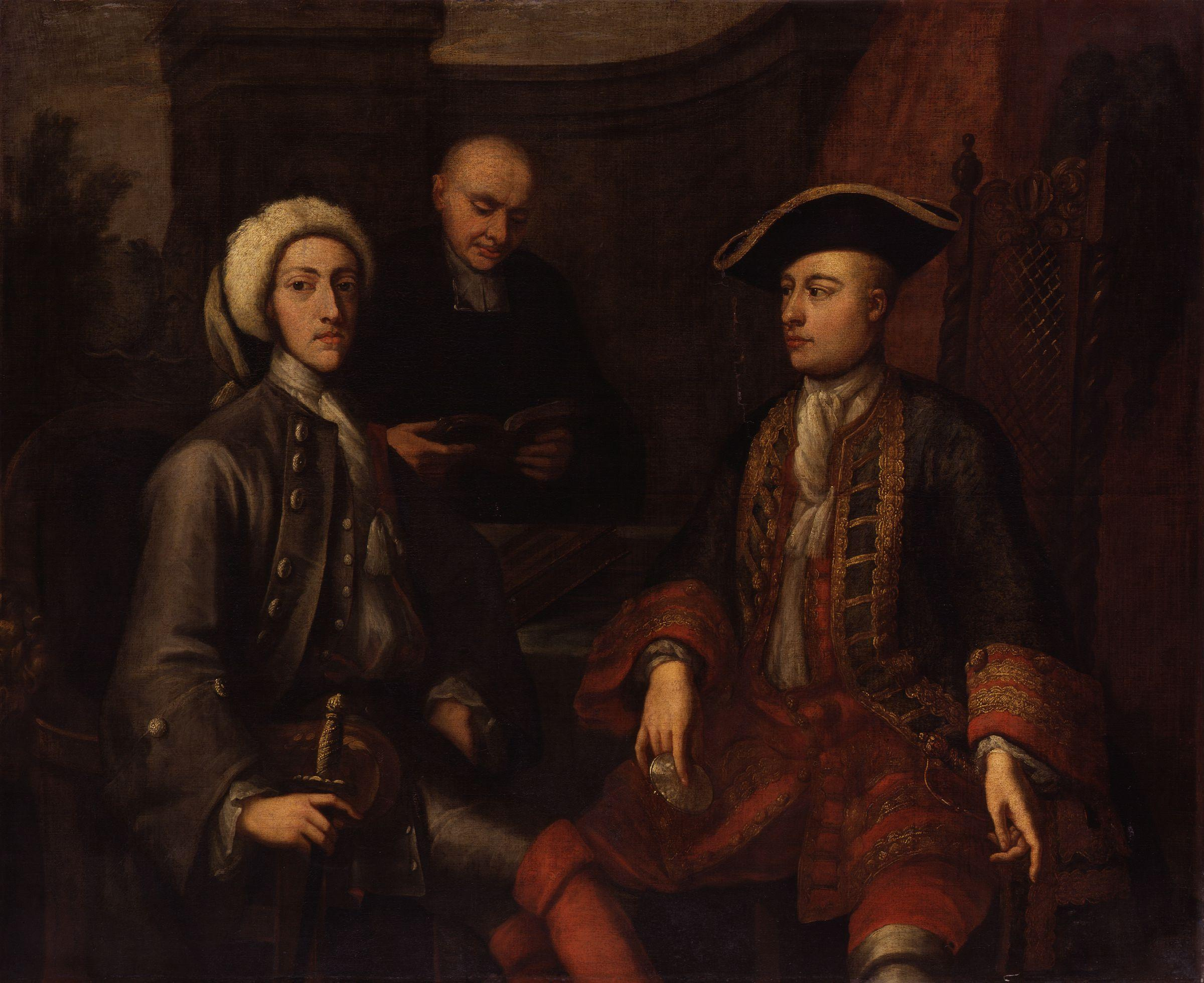
- Three unknown men, of which two formerly known as John Montagu, 2nd Duke of Montagu, James O'Hara, 2nd Baron Tyrawley
- Artist: John Verelst (attributed)
- Year: 1712
- Medium: Oil on canvas
- Dimensions: 144.8 cm × 176.5 cm (57.0 in × 69.5 in)
- Location: National Portrait Gallery, London
- Accession: NPG 2034

John Verelst (c. 1670 – 7 March 1734) was an Anglo-Dutch portrait painter. He was the third son of Herman Verelst (a portrait painter) and Cecilia Fend. He is known mainly for a royal commission for portraits of the men known at the time as the Four Indian Kings, who visited Queen Anne in 1710 from the Province of New York in North America. John Verelst is often confused with his uncle, John Verelst (1648–1679).

== Biography ==
John Verelst was born c. 1670 after his parents had left Amsterdam following the decline in the Low Country art market. He was one of the four sons of Herman Verelst (a portrait painter) and Cecilia Fend, originally from Venice. Lacking archival evidence, the date is calculated by reference to information about his siblings. He is mentioned as a beneficiary in his brother Lodvick’s will between Peter (who did not become an artist) and Michael. Peter was born in September 1669 in Amsterdam; Michael’s birth was c. 1675 in Venice. John may have been born while the family was travelling or had travelled from Amsterdam to Venice following the collapse of the art market in the Low Countries.

Herman Verelst’s career took him from Venice to Ljubljana and thence to Vienna from where the family fled in 1683, reaching London where Herman established himself as a portrait painter.

John married Anne Tureng at St James's, Duke's Place on 4 November 1692. They had eight children. The eldest, Herman Verelst (1694-1764), was the secretary or accountant to a number of organizations including the Foundling Hospital and the Trustees for the Establishment of the Colony of Georgia in America. Robert (1702-1741) was the father of the colonial governor in India, Harry Verelst. William Verelst (1704-1751) alone followed his father in practising as a portrait painter. (Note: A full family tree is given by Peter Hancox.)

In 1711, John and his sister, Adriana Verelst, applied for naturalization.

John Verelst died on 7 March 1734 in London and was buried three days later at St Christopher le Stocks. His will suggests that he was relatively poor having, he claimed, previously distributed his wealth to his children and, presumably, his wife who survived him. (Note: Anne Verelst (née Tureng) was buried at St Christopher le Stocks on 14 December 1761.) His executors were required to compile an inventory of his possessions and this provides insights into both his domestic and workshop circumstances and some of his last artistic projects.

== Artistic career ==
Presumably John was trained in portraiture by his father, Herman Verelst, who had success in England as a portrait painter from 1684 until his death in 1699. John was, from an early point in his career, both a painter and a dealer (in both prints and paintings), using newspapers to advertise and (in an entrepreneurial spirit) looking for new opportunities to exploit. Works attributed to John Verelst are quite common but documented items are much rarer and, in some cases, have disappeared or are now unidentifiable.

As John Verelst married in late 1692, he had probably already begun a career in art of some sort. The earliest documented portrait of 1700 is that of Martha Loft (c. 1685-1723). (Note: Martha Loft (from Middlesex) married William Finmore of Oxford on 14 May 1702. They lived at North Hinksey where she bore fifteen children. She was buried in the church of St Lawrence on 1 November 1723.) In 1703, prints of ‘Charles III, King of Spain’ were advertised in The Daily Courant (the first British daily newspaper) for sale by the engraver (George White), J. Verelst at the Globe in the Strand and printshops. (Note: ‘Charles III, King of Spain’, was Charles VI, Holy Roman Emperor who, on the death of Charles II of Spain, was supported as successor by England and its allies in the War of the Spanish Succession. A description of the original portrait was given: “The true Effigies of Charles III, King of Spain, done by the Original Picture drawn at Vienna, and sent by the Emperor to Count Wratislau his Envoy to Her Majesty of Great Brittain.”). Verelst would make use newspaper advertising regularly from about 1710 to 1725.

=== Mohawk Kings ===
Four Mohawk Kings
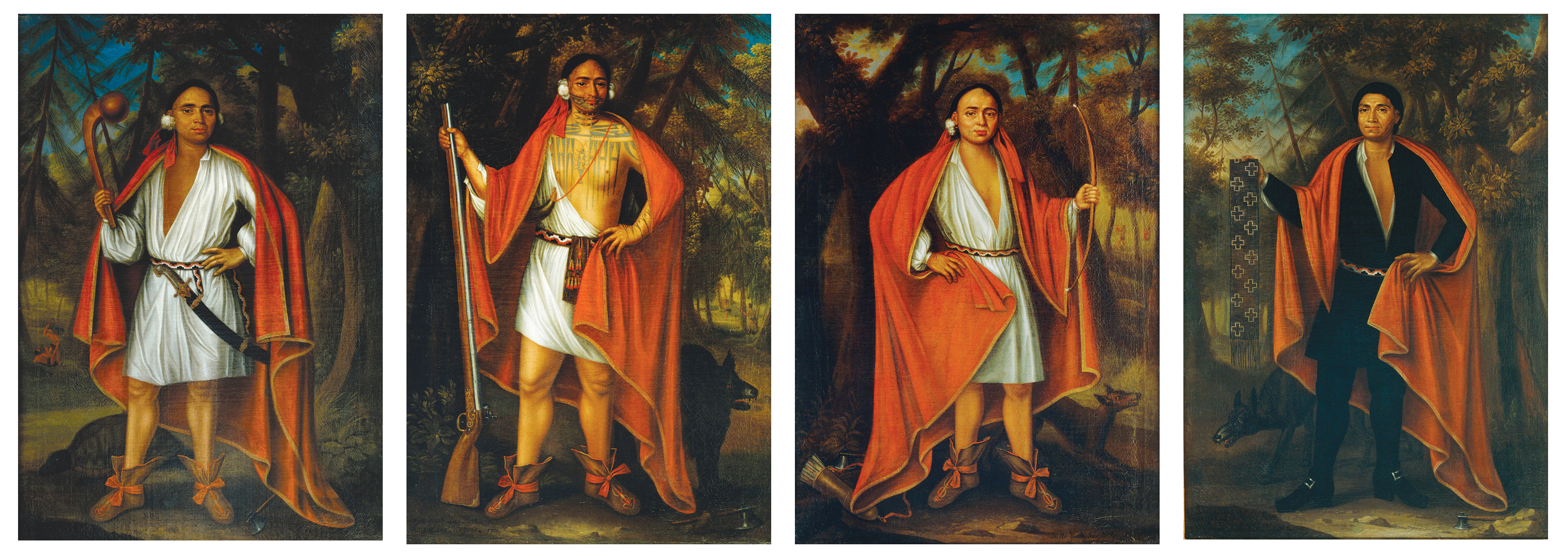
- Etow Oh Koam (Mohican), Sa Ga Yeath Qua Pieth Tow, Ho Nee Yeath Taw No Row, Tee Yee Ho Ga Row
- Artist: John Verelst
- Year: 1710
- Medium: Oil on canvas
- Dimensions: 91.5 cm × 64.5 cm (36.0 in × 25.4 in)
- Location: National Archives of Canada, Ottawa
- Accession: C-092421, C-092419, C-092417, C-092415

To seal a treaty with the British, four Indigenous delegates (called "Indian kings" by the British)--three Haudenosaunee and one Anishinaabe--visited London in 1710. Queen Anne was so impressed by these tall, muscular foreign visitors that she had Verelst paint oil paintings of them in 1710 (see Four Mohawk Kings). This was one of the first paintings of aboriginal people. The chiefs had come voluntarily and were well treated as diplomats and entertained. They were Tee Yee Neen Ho Ga Row (Hendriks), Emperor of the Six Nations; Ho Nee Yeath Taw No Row (John), King of Generethgarich; Sa Ga Yeath Qua Pieth Tow (Brant) of the Maquas; he was the grandfather of Joseph Brant, a chief during the Revolutionary War and namesake for Brantford, Ontario; and Etow Oh Koam (Nicholas), King of the River Nation. They had been persuaded to come to England by Peter Schuyler, acting Governor of New York in 1709 and some-time mayor of Albany. They stayed one month and returned without having contracted any of the endemic European diseases.

The four portraits were later transformed into mezzotint prints by artists, including Anglo-French printmaker John Simon (1675–1751), and sold widely. The four portraits of these First Nations chiefs were initially displayed at Kensington Palace, then moved to Hampton Court Palace (where they appeared in an inventory of 1835). They do not appear in any later inventories and must be assumed to have left the Royal Collection. Paintings of the four kings by John Verelst appear in the collection of Lord Petre at Thorndon Hall by 1851. These paintings were purchased by the Public Archives of Canada with aid from the Secretary of State in 1977. They were featured on a Canadian postage stamp in 2010.

=== After the royal commission: a career in decline ===
Verelst received no further royal commissions and there is little evidence of his activity until the end of the decade when he organized an auction of Original Pictures of the Most Eminent Italian, Flemish, and other Masters, collected by Mr. John Verelst advertised for 6 March 1718 at Mr Hickford’s Dancing Room in James Street. The sale apparently stopped at lot 50 and was to be transferred to Verelst’s house at the Rainbow and Dove by Ivy-Bridge on 19 March 1718 but, in a notice in The Daily Courant of 18 March, the sale was postponed indefinitely. A last newspaper announcement of 23 June 1724 drew the public’s attention to Verelst’s portrait of Admiral Abdelkader Pérez, the ambassador of the Emperor of Morocco. This had been displayed for several days at the Court of St James's (with another painted for Sir Clement Cotterell) and could be seen at John’s house. In the early 1720s, he had some contact with the nonjuror faction of the Church of England. He was named as a subscriber to the 1721 publication of Louis-Sébastien Le Nain de Tillemont’s The history of the Arians, and of the Council of Nice translated by Thomas Deacon, a non-juror from Manchester. George Vertue engraved Verelst’s 1722 picture of Ralph Taylor, a prominent non-juror who was later consecrated bishop and went on to consecrate bishops irregularly for service in the American colonies.

Verelst’s career after the royal commission was one of decline. In 1727, he was declared bankrupt followed by an enforced sale in which a version of the Moroccan ambassador’s portrait sold well. He wrote his will in 1730 leaving comparatively little in comparison with his siblings Lodvick and Adriana. (Note: Lodvick Verelst left a gold guinea to his mother and to each of his siblings; John Verelst left a shilling to each of four sons, leaving the residue of his estate to his wife, Anne, during her lifetime and then to be equally divided between their daughter, Cecilia, and son, William Verelst.) When he died in March 1734, an inventory of his goods and chattels was required. It contains the usual range of household goods and some painting materials, including old frames and partly completed pictures. Verelst had been working on a copy of a portrait of a Mr Water, a joint enterprise with a Mr Bishop to acquire and sell thirty-two paintings which Verelst was preparing for market, and a consignment of eighteen pictures worth £20 to be shipped to India. John Verelst’s career finished as it started: using a variety of means to make a living through art.

== Selected works ==
- Tejonihokarawa (baptized Hendrick). Named Tee Yee Neen Ho Ga Row, Emperor of the Six Nations. 1710, oil on canvas, 91.5 x 64.5 cm, Library and Archives Canada, Ottawa, inv. acc. no. 1977-35-4.
- Etowaucum (baptized Nicholas). Named Etow Oh Koam, King of the River Nation, 1710, oil on canvas, 91.5 x 64.5 cm, Library and Archives Canada, Ottawa, inv. 1977-35-1.
- Onigoheriago (baptized John). Named Ho Nee Yeath Taw No Row, King of the Generethgarich, 1710, oil on canvas, 91.5 x 64.5 cm, Library and Archives Canada, Ottawa, inv. 1977-35-2.
- Sagayenkwaraton (baptized Brant). Named Sa Ga Yeath Qua Pieth Tow, King of the Maquas (Mohawk), 1710, oil on canvas, 91.5 x 64.5 cm, Library and Archives Canada, Ottawa, inv. 1977-35-3.

Prints

- John Simon after John Verelst, Tee Yee Neen Ho Ga Row, Emperour of the Six Nations, 1710, mezzotint on laid paper, 41.5 x 25.5 cm, National Gallery of Art, Washington, DC, inv. 2001.118.44.
- John Simon after John Verelst, Etow Oh Koam, King of the River Nation, 1710, mezzotint on laid paper, 41.2 x 25.4 cm, National Gallery of Art, Washington, DC, inv. 2001.118.42.
- John Simon after John Verelst, Ho Nee Yeath Taw No Row, King of the Generethgarich, 1710, mezzotint on laid paper, 40.9 × 25.4 cm, National Gallery of Art, Washington, DC, inv. 2001.118.41.
- John Simon after John Verelst, Sa Ga Yeath Qua Pieth Tow, King of the Maquas, 1710, mezzotint on laid paper, 41 x 25.4 cm, National Gallery of Art, Washington, DC, inv. 2001.118.43.
- George Vertue after John Verelst Iacobus Gardiner A.M., 1717, mezzotint, 16.8 x 10.7 cm, The British Museum, London, inv. 1889,0409.309.
- George Vertue after John Verelst Reverendi admodum Radulph Taylor S.T.P., 1723, mezzotint, 37.5 x 26.7 cm, The British Museum, London, inv. 1849,1031.87.
- George Vertue after John Verelst Daniel Turner of the College of Phisicians, aetat 67, 1734, [1734], mezzotint on laid paper, 21.7 x 18.7 cm, Ashmolean Museum, Oxford, inv. WAHP38413.
