= Four Mohawk Kings =

1710 group of Mohawk emissaries to Britain

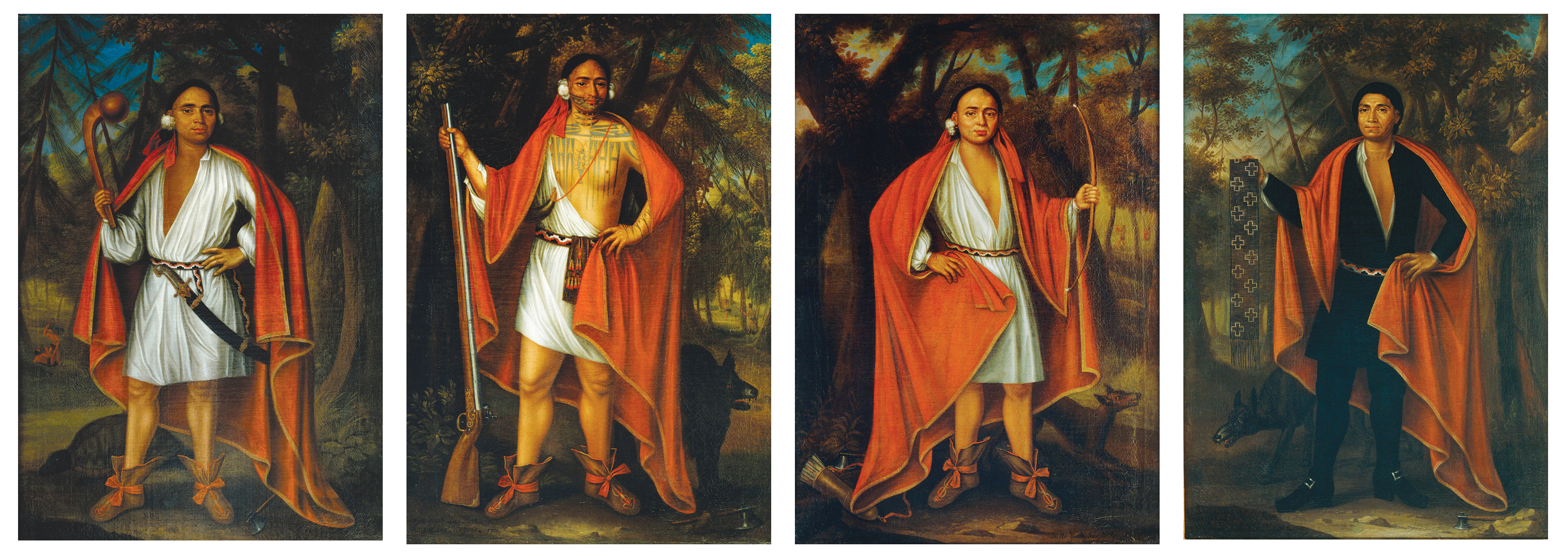
Four Indian Kings painted by John Verelst, 1710. From left to right: Etow Oh Koam (Mohican), Sa Ga Yeath Qua Pieth Tow, Ho Nee Yeath Taw No Row, and Tee Yee Ho Ga Row. (National Archives of Canada - Artist: John Verelst C-092421, C-092419, C-092417, C-092415)

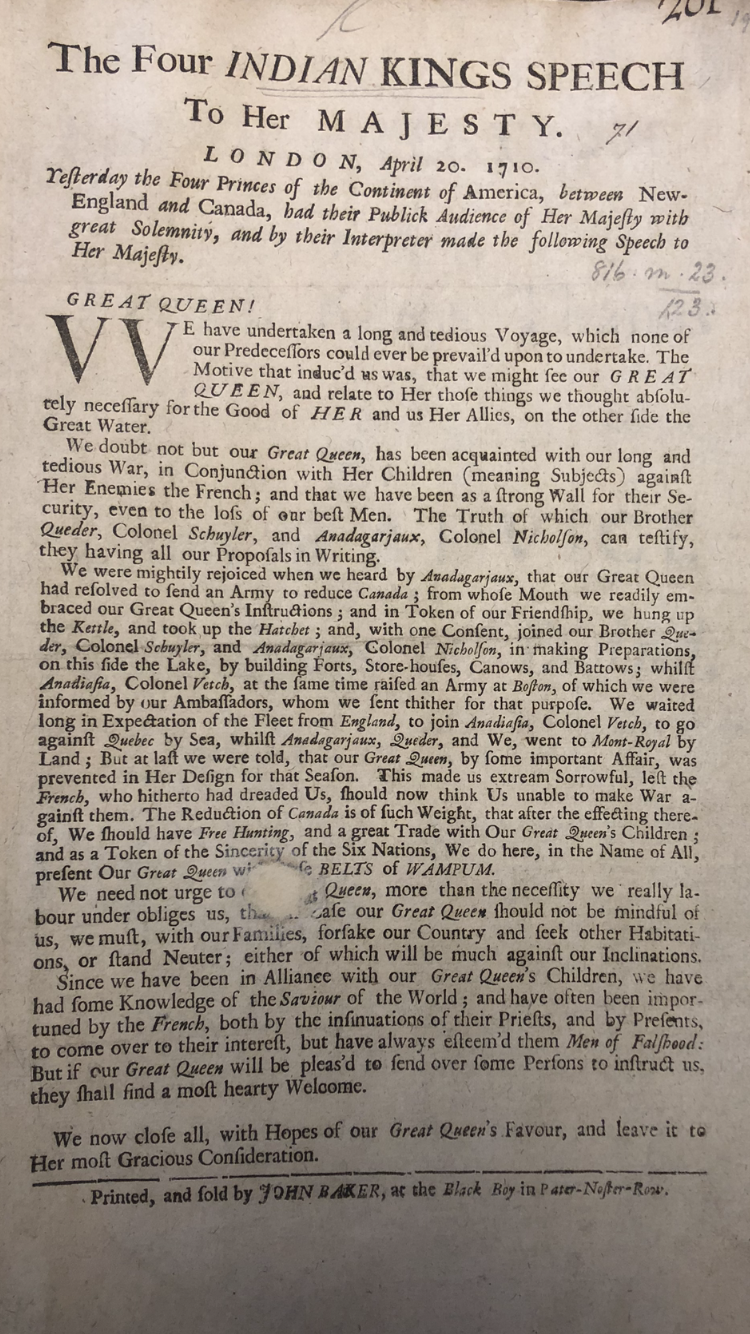
The Four Indian Kings' Speech to Her Majesty, published in London by John Baker. This is a transcription of the speech that the Four Kings made to Queen Anne on April 20, 1710.

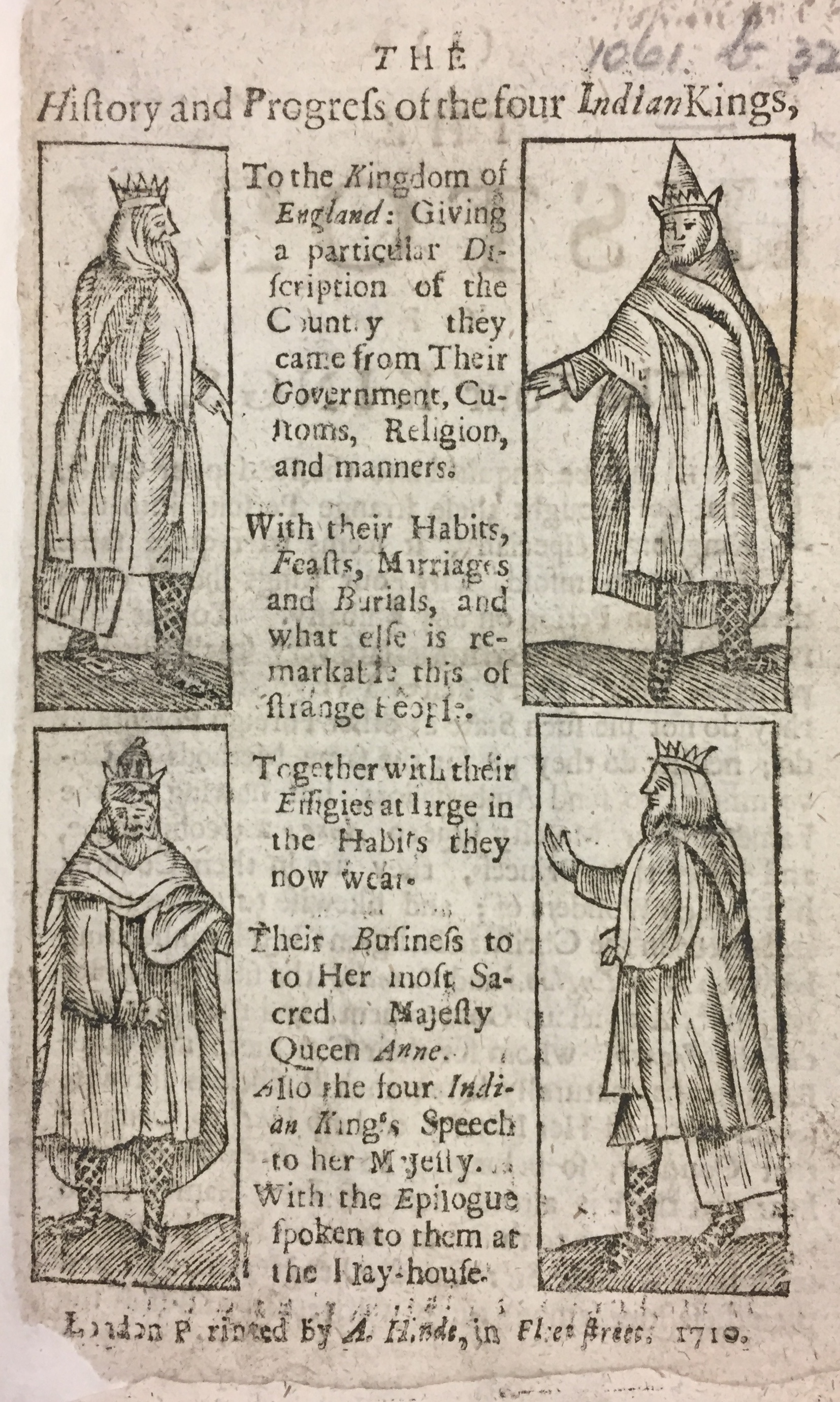
Pamphlet printed in London in 1710 which describes and depicts the Four Kings

The Four Indian Kings or Four Kings of the New World were three Mohawk chiefs from one of the Five Nations of the Haudenosaunee Confederacy and a Mohican of the Algonquian peoples, whose portraits were painted by John Verelst in London to commemorate their travel from New York in 1710 to meet Queen Anne of Great Britain. The three Mohawk were: Sa Ga Yeath Qua Pieth Tow of the Bear Clan, called King of Maquas, with the Christian name Peter Brant (grandfather of Mohawk leader Joseph Brant); Ho Nee Yeath Taw No Row of the Wolf Clan, called King of Canajoharie or John of Canajoharie; and Tee Yee Ho Ga Row, meaning "Double Life", of the Wolf Clan, also called Hendrick Tejonihokarawa or King Hendrick. The Mohican chief was Etow Oh Koam of the Turtle Clan, mistakenly identified in his portrait as Emperor of the Six Nations. The Algonquian-speaking Mohican people were not part of the Haudenosaunee Confederacy. Five chiefs set out on the journey, but one died in mid-Atlantic.

== History ==
The four Native American leaders visited Queen Anne in 1710, as part of a diplomatic visit organised by Pieter Schuyler, mayor of Albany, New York. They were received in London as diplomats, being transported through the streets of the city in Royal carriages, and received by Queen Anne at the Court of St. James Palace. They also visited the Tower of London and St Paul's Cathedral.

In addition to requesting military aid for defence against the French, the chiefs asked for missionaries to offset the influence of French Jesuits, who had converted numerous Mohawk to Catholicism. Queen Anne informed the Archbishop of Canterbury, Thomas Tenison. A mission was authorized, and Mayor Schuyler had a chapel built the next year at Fort Hunter (located near the Mohawk "Lower Castle" village) along the Mohawk River. Queen Anne sent a gift of a silver Communion set and a reed organ. The Mohawk village known as the "Lower Castle" became mostly Christianized in the early 18th century, unlike the "Upper Castle" at Canajoharie further upriver. No mission at the latter was founded until 1769, when William Johnson, the British agent to the Haudenosaunee, built the Indian Castle Church. It still stands.

To commemorate the diplomatic visit to London, the Crown commissioned John Verelst to paint the portraits of the Four Kings. These paintings were initially displayed at Kensington Palace, then moved to Hampton Court Palace (where they appeared in an inventory of 1835). They do not appear in any later inventories and must be assumed to have left the Royal Collection. Paintings of the four kings by John Verelst appear in the collection of Lord Petre at Thorndon Hall by 1851. These paintings were purchased by the Public Archives of Canada with aid from the Secretary of State in 1977. Queen Elizabeth II unveiled them in Ottawa.

During their visit to London, they lodged at The Crown and Cushion, in King Street, Covent Garden. Thomas Arne was their host, he was an inn keeper and an upholsterer, he was very kind and considerate to his visitors. Because of this, the Indians renamed him Cataraqui in a Mohawk christening ceremony. Cataraqui was the fort that has now become the city of Kingston, Ontario. Here they slept on beds for the first time and became accustomed to them.

The four kings were quite a spectacle in London, they were all described in a contemporary pamphlet as being in shape, muscular and within an inch or two of being six feet tall. Their complexions were described as being brown and their hair long and black."Their visages are very awful and majestick, and their features regular enough, though something of the austere and sullen." Their faces are covered in art, probably meant to inspire terror during battle. They are described as polite, they will not refuse any drink or food that is offered to them. They loved English beef more than any other kind of food offered to them. The people of London also described them as healthy. "Their health is good, as is proper for primitives; they know no gout, dropsy, gravel, or fevers."

When they met with Queen Anne the court was mourning for the death of the Prince of Denmark, so the four Indian Kings were dressed in all black attire when they met with her. Their address to her was read, they asked for military assistance and missionaries to lead them to "true religion." After the reading, the chiefs presented the queen with several belts of wampum to signify their meeting. Queen Anne was moved by the address and had it referred to her Ministry. The queen also engaged the four men in conversation through their interpreter, Peter Schuyler's brother John. The chiefs offered to show the queen their abilities by hunting down a deer and capturing it without a weapon, although there is no proof they were put to the test. In return for the gifts of the wampum, the queen gave them a set of communion plates, with the royal cipher and coat of arms, for a future Mohawk chapel. (These are now divided between the Mohawk reserves at Brantford, Ontario, and Tyendinaga, near Kingston.) The Archbishop of Canterbury gave each of the chiefs a Bible bound in Turkey-red leather.

The four Chiefs also got to tour and do things all over London to honor their visit. They watched a review of the Guards in Hyde Park; they visited the Banqueting House and Chapel at Whitehall; they were taken on the Queen's barge to Greenwich Hospital and the Woolwich Arsenal, where they heard a saluting cannonade. They listened to sermons in the city's churches. They were guests of honour at a dinner hosted by the Board of Trade and were privately entertained by William Penn at the Taverne du Diable at Charing Cross. They attended a performance of Powell's Marionettes at Punch's Theatre; a presentation of Macbeth where they got to sit on the stage.

The Kings, with Peter Schuyler, sailed for home in May 1710. Their mission had consequences. It encouraged the Court to war against French Canada. "It helped to bind the Mohawk to the English side in the century of conflict that was to follow. And it inspired a notable missionary effort. By royal order a combination military stronghold and missionary center was erected in the heart of the Mohawk country. This was Fort Hunter, near Amsterdam, New York."

None of the four Indian King's recollections of their experience in London, England has survived, as it was told in the Mohawk tradition of verbal story telling. A contemporary editor (Spectator 27/04/1711) provided a translated specimen of their ostensible observations.

== Sa Ga Yeath Qua Pieth Tow (King of Maquas) (Peter Brant) ==
Sa Ga Yeath Qua Pieth Tow, also known as Peter Brant, Brant Thowariage, or Saquainquaragton, was one of the three Haudenosaunee (Iroquois) chiefs who traveled to Great Britain to meet the Queen. He was a Mohawk sachem and a member of the Bear Clan. During his visit, Sa Ga Yeath Qua Pieth Tow was baptized and from then on called Peter Brant. He was the grandfather of famous Haudenosaunee leader Joseph Brant. This portrait of Peter Brant is some of the best records of 18th-century Aboriginal tattooing in existence. The tattoos were created by first stenciling on the skin and then stabbed into the flesh with needles or little bones until it bled. Although the exact meaning of his tattoos is unknown it can be assumed that his detailed tattoos are because of his status as a leader and a warrior. Brant died soon after he returned from London. Sa Ga Yeath Qua Pieth Tow was the brother of the "Emperor" Tee Yee Ho Ga Row.

== Ho Nee Yeath Taw No Row (King of Canajoharie) (John of Canajoharie) ==
Ho Nee Yeath Taw No Row was born in what is now Upstate New York. He was one of the three Haudenosaunee (Iroquois) chiefs who traveled to Great Britain to meet the Queen. Ho Nee Yeath Taw No Row was baptized and then called John. Ho Nee Yeath Taw No Row was a part of the Wolf Clan, and that is why a wolf is depicted with him in his portrait by John Verelst. Just like the other chiefs the symbolic skin markings, clothing, and beautiful or unique items were all ways that Native diplomats demonstrated their values and status.

== Etow Oh Koam (Nicholas) ==
Etow Oh Koam was a Mohican and not a Haudenosaunee chief, but he also traveled with the other chiefs to Great Britain to meet the Queen. In Etow Oh Koam's portrait by Verelst, he is holding a carved wooden ball-headed club, which shows his status as a warrior. Etow Oh Koam has a Thunderbird tattooed on his face, the Thunderbird was thought to be a powerful sky spirit and it was a symbol of spiritual support for a warrior to wear it.

== Tee Yee Ho Ga Row (Hendrick Tejonihokarawa) (King Hendrick) ==
Tee Yee Ho Ga Row (baptized Hendrick) was the third of the three Haudenosaunee (Iroquois) chiefs who traveled to Great Britain to meet the Queen. He is called the "Emperor of the Six Nations". Tee Yee Ho Ga Row is depicted in his portrait by Verelst as holding a wampum belt. The wampum belt was a significant item to the Haudenosaunee people that serves to remember the meeting and to represent an alliance that cannot be broken unless the belt is returned. The people of London described Tee Yee Ho Ga Row as tall and handsome, his complexion showed "the shadowed livery of the burnished sun". He was about thirty years old, and a powerful man among his people, he was described as a good friend to the English. Tee Yee Ga Row traveled to England with his brother Sa Ga Yeath Qua Pieth Tow.

== See also ==
- The Canadian Crown and Aboriginal peoples
