= Platter Kill =

River in New York, United States

- Location of mouth within New York Platter Kill (the United States)

Location
- Country: United States
- State: New York
- Region: Central New York
- County: Schoharie

Physical characteristics
- Source
  - coordinates: 42°27′52″N 74°23′18″W
- Mouth: Schoharie Creek
  - coordinates: 42°24′19″N 74°27′03″W
  - elevation: 932 ft (284 m)
- Length: 24.8 mi (39.9 km)
- Basin size: 11 sq mi (28 km^{2})

Basin features
- Progression: Platter Kill → Schoharie Creek → Mohawk River → Hudson River → Upper New York Bay

Platter Kill is a river in Schoharie County in the state of New York. It flows into the Schoharie Creek. The Platter Kill's 11-square-mile (28 km^{2}) watershed accounts for about 1.2 percent of the Schoharie basin.

== Hydrology ==
Graph from Gilboa USGS stream gauge showing rise in discharge after Tropical Storm Irene

The United States Geological Survey (USGS) has maintained one stream gauge along Platter Kill in operation since 1975. The station located 0.6 miles (0.97 km) northwest of Gilboa, had a maximum discharge of 1,750 cubic feet (50 m^{3}) per second on August 28, 2011, as Hurricane Irene passed through the area, and a minimum discharge of 0.31 cubic feet (0.0088 m^{3}) per second on March 11, 2015.
