= Fly Creek (Schoharie Creek tributary) =

- Location of the mouth within New York Fly Creek (Schoharie Creek tributary) (the United States)

Location
- Country: United States
- State: New York
- Region: Central New York
- Counties: Montgomery, Schoharie

Physical characteristics
- Source: Unnamed swamp
  - location: North of Sloansville
  - coordinates: 42°47′23″N 74°20′06″W
  - elevation: Approximately 1,300 ft (400 m)
- Mouth: Schoharie Creek
  - location: South of Sloansville
  - coordinates: 42°44′34″N 74°19′32″W
  - elevation: 558 ft (170 m)
- Basin size: 22 sq mi (57 km^{2})

Basin features
- Progression: Fly Creek → Schoharie Creek → Mohawk River → Hudson River → Upper New York Bay

Fly Creek is a river in Montgomery and Schoharie counties in the state of New York. It begins at an unnamed swamp north of Sloansville and flows into the Schoharie Creek south of Sloansville.

== Hydrology ==
Water in Fly Creek is moderately healthy with an excellent habitat for aquatic life. Due to low levels of urban and commercial development, large wetland areas, and several small private forests the water quality is very good.
