= House Creek (New York) =

Location
- Country: United States
- State: New York

Physical characteristics
- Mouth: Panther Creek
  - location: West Fulton, New York, United States
  - coordinates: 42°33′53″N 74°27′42″W
- Basin size: 13.1 mi^{2} (34 km^{2})

Basin features
- Tributaries
  - right: Heathen Creek

House Creek is a river in Schoharie County, New York. It converges with Panther Creek by West Fulton, New York.
