= Roaring Kill =

Location
- Country: United States
- State: New York

Physical characteristics
- Source
  - location: Greene County, New York
- Mouth: Schoharie Creek
  - location: Tannersville, Greene County, New York, United States
  - coordinates: 42°09′18″N 74°07′25″W
- Basin size: 2.78 mi^{2} (7.2 km^{2})

Roaring Kill flows into the Schoharie Creek by Tannersville, New York.
