= St Christopher le Stocks =

Coordinates: 51.5141°N 0.0886°W

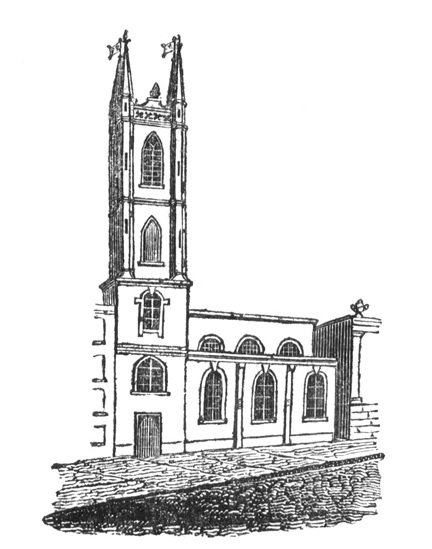
- St Christopher le Stocks
- Location: Threadneedle Street, London
- Country: England
- Denomination: Anglican

Architecture
- Architect: Christopher Wren
- Closed: 1781
- Demolished: 1782

St Christopher le Stocks was a parish church on the north side of Threadneedle Street in the Broad Street Ward of the City of London. Of Medieval origin, it was rebuilt following the Great Fire of London in 1666, but demolished in 1781 to make way for an extension of the neighbouring Bank of England.

== History ==
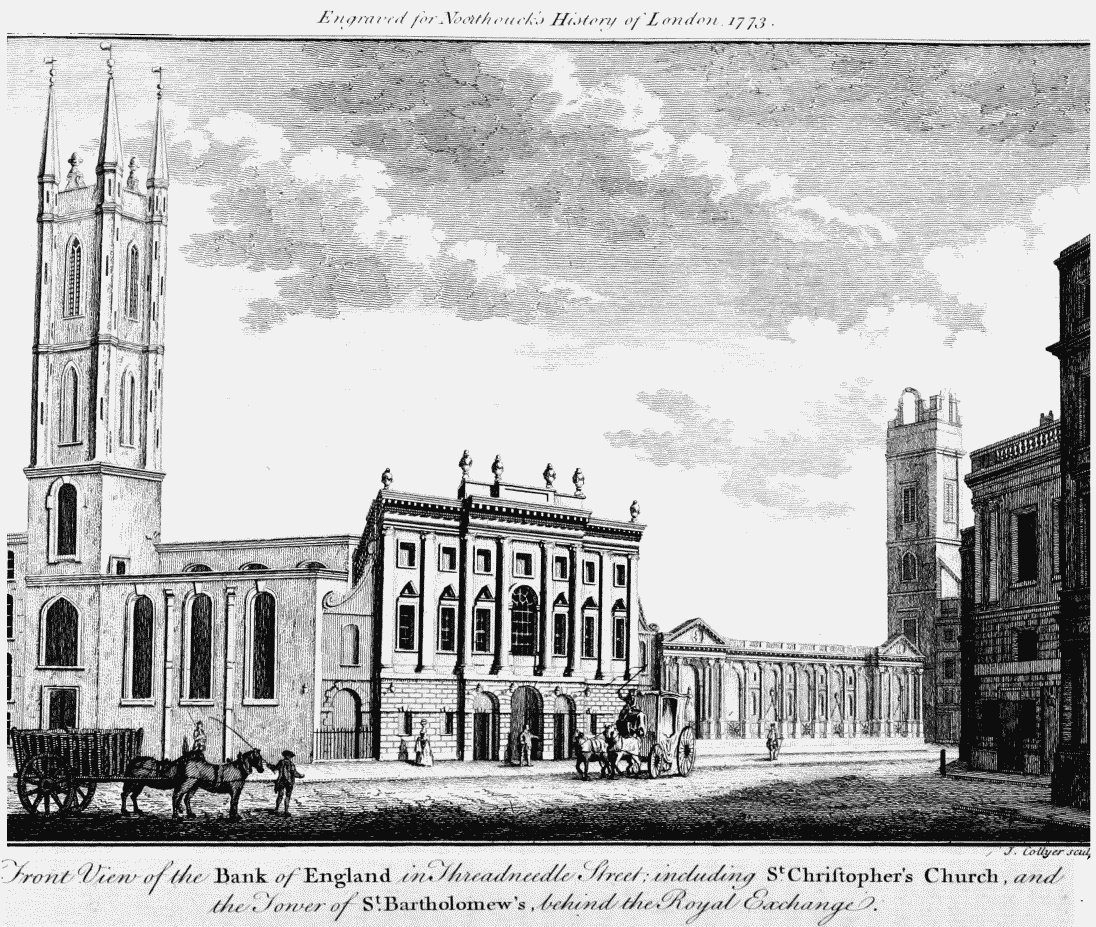
St Christopher le Stocks, alongside the Bank of England, in 1773

The earliest reference to the church is in 1282. The origin of the name is disputed: Freshfield (1876) maintained that it referred to the city stocks, which at one time stood close to the church, but Huelin (1996) believed it to be a reference to the nearby Stock Exchange. Endowments were bequeathed in 1427 and 1506.

The church was severely damaged in the Great Fire of London in 1666, although the outer walls and tower survived. It was rebuilt by Sir Christopher Wren in 1671 using much of the surviving material, and was the first of his churches to be completed at a cost of £2,098 12s 7d. Edward Hatton, in his New View of London (1708) wrote of the restored church that "all the old part which the fire left, is of the Gothick Order; but the pillars within, are of the Tuscan. And the walls are of old stone, finished or rendered over".

As it stood at the beginning of the 18th century, the church was 72 feet long, 52 feet wide, and 40 feet high. The tower was about 80 feet tall; the steeple only housed one bell, the older peal having been destroyed in the Great Fire. Inside, the restored church had a wooden ceiling, divided into rectangular panels, and there was a seraph carved on the keystone of each arch. The church was wainscoted with oak to a height of about 8 feet (2.4 m).

Saint Christopher-le-Stocks Church, London Act 1781
- Act of Parliament
- Parliament of Great Britain
- Long title: An Act for vesting the Parish Church of Saint Christopher Le Stocks, in the City of London, and the Materials and Scite thereof, and the Church Yard thereto adjoining, in the Governor and Company of the Bank of England and their Successors for ever; and for uniting the said Parish to the Parish of Saint Margaret Lothbury in the said City.
- Citation: 21 Geo. 3. c. 71
- Territorial extent: Great Britain

Dates
- Royal assent: 18 July 1781
- Commencement: 31 October 1780 (Note: Start of session.)
- Repealed: 8 November 1995
Other legislation
Repealed by	Statute Law (Repeals) Act 1995

Status: Repealed

Text of statute as originally enacted

During the 18th century, the Bank of England gradually bought up adjoining properties, extending its site into the parish. In 1781 it came to an agreement with the rector of St Christopher's, and its patron, the Bishop of London, allowing it to demolish the church itself, which was then confirmed by the Saint Christopher-le-Stocks Church, London Act 1781 (21 Geo. 3. c. 71). This was not only motivated by a desire to build on the land, but also by a fear that rioters might use the church as a platform to attack the bank, a concern sparked by the Gordon Riots of 1780. The parish was united with that of St Margaret Lothbury in 1781, and the church pulled down the next year. By 1800, due to the expansion of the bank, there were only 19 houses in the parish (with 133 inhabitants), down from 92 houses in 1732. The churchyard was also requisitioned in 1798, and now lies underneath the bank's Garden Court. Some parish records still exist.

A parish boundary mark (marking the boundary with that of St Bartholomew-by-the-Exchange) can be seen on the front wall of the Bank of England. A similar mark is visible on the Princes Street elevation of the bank, marking the boundary with St Margaret Lothbury.

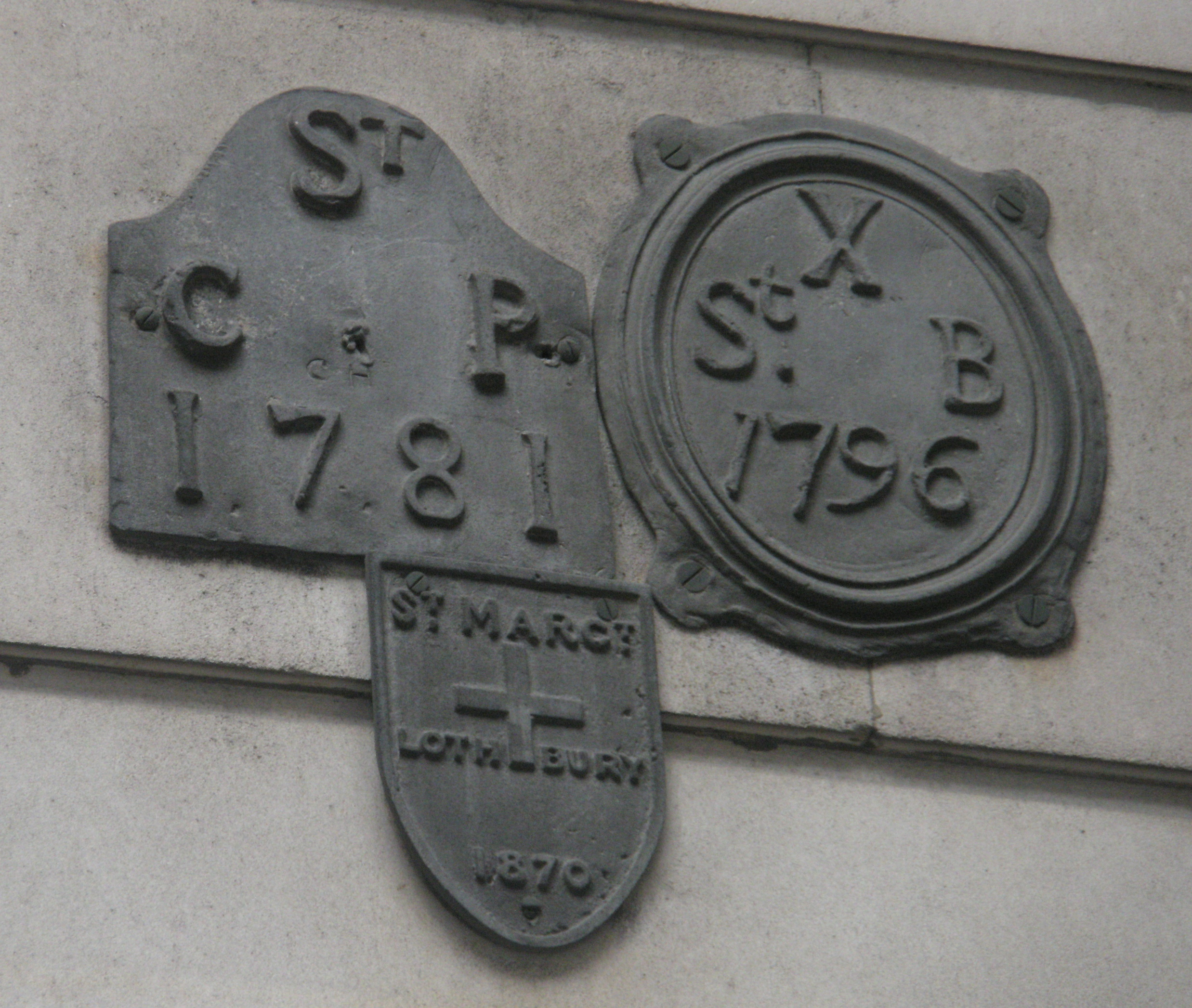
Thumb

The upper panels of the pulpit dating from Wren's 1671 rebuilding survive at St Nicholas's Church, Canewdon in Essex, and are a fine specimen of carving of the Grinling Gibbons style.

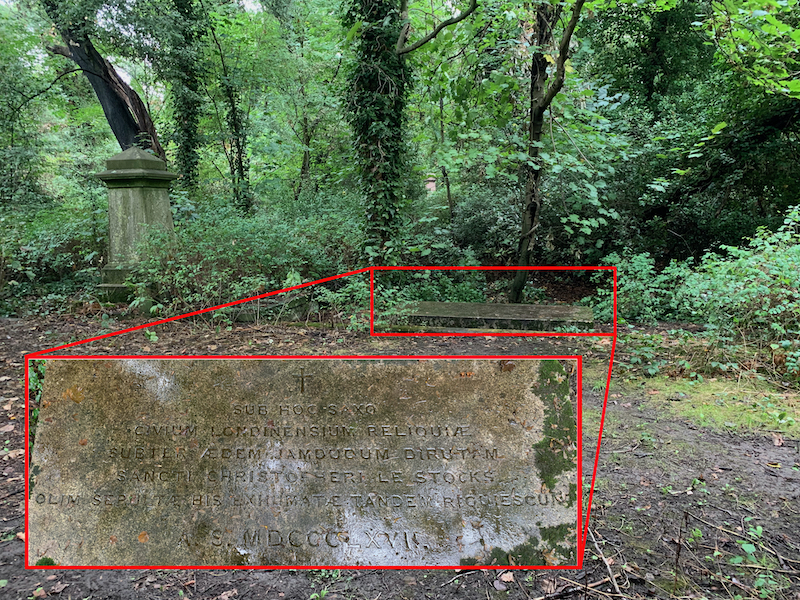
St Christopher le Stocks memorial in Nunhead Cemetery

== Re-interment of human remains ==
The remains of those interred in the church and churchyard of St Christopher's were removed during development of the Bank of England in 1867 to Nunhead Cemetery in South East London. When the bank underwent wholesale redevelopment in the 1930s, further relocations of interred remains were made to Nunhead in 1933.

Among those buried at the church was the scientist and polymath Thomas Harriot, the first person to map the Moon's surface using a telescope.

== Parish clerks ==
In common with all City of London parishes, St Christopher le Stocks still has a serving parish clerk; currently Stephen Plumb. St Christopher's clerk, is appointed by the rector and parochial church council of St Margaret, Lothbury. There are eight parish clerks serving at St Margaret, Lothbury, reflecting the eight united parishes.

== See also ==
- List of Christopher Wren churches in London
- List of churches rebuilt after the Great Fire but since demolished

== Bibliography ==
- Amery, C. (1988). Essex Wren's London. Luton: Lennard. ISBN 1-85291-009-7.
- Freshfield, E. (1876). Essex Published parochial records of St Margaret Lothbury with St Christopher-le-Stocks and Bartholomew-by-the-Exchange. London: Rixon & Arnold.
- Griffiths, P. (1997). "Essex Secrecy and authority in late sixteenth- and seventeenth-century London". The Historical Journal. 40. Cambridge University Press: 925–951. ISSN 0018-246X. 3E(007528)
- Huelin, G. (1996). Essex Vanished churches of the City of London. London: Guildhall Library Publishing. ISBN 0900422424.
- Reynolds, H. (1922). Essex Churches of the City of London. London: Bodley Head.
- Woollacott, R. (2006). Essex The Victorian Catacombs at Nunhead. London: Friends of Nunhead Cemetery. ISBN 0-9539194-6-3.
- Pevsner, Nikolaus (2002). Essex. The Buildings of England. New Haven, US and London: Yale University Press. ISBN 978-0-140-71011-3.
