= Schoharie Creek =

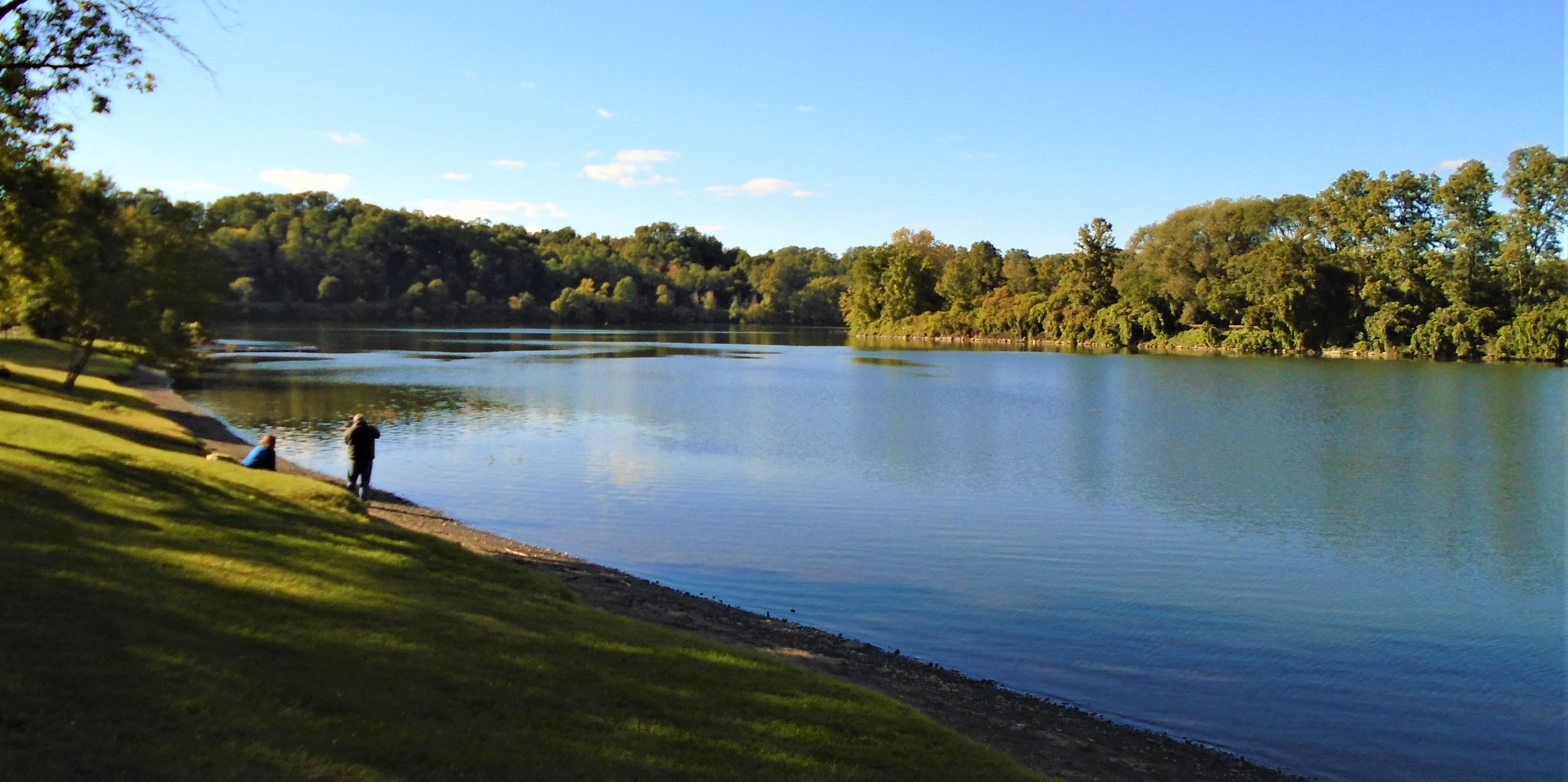
- Schoharie Creek flowing into the Mohawk River, from Tribes Hill Park in Amsterdam, New York.

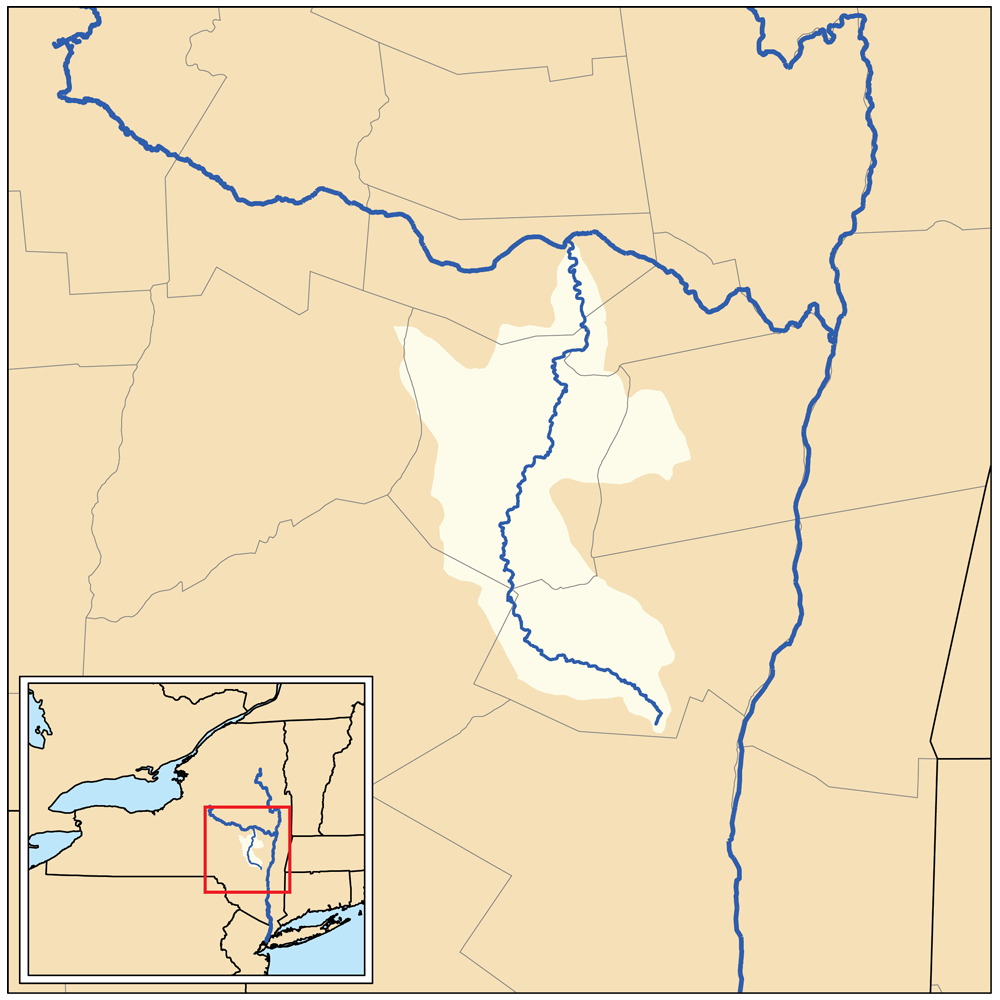
- Map of the Schoharie Creek drainage basin

Location
- Country: United States
- State: New York

Physical characteristics
- Source: Indian Head Mountain
- Mouth: Mohawk River
  - location: Fort Hunter
  - coordinates: 42°56′28″N 74°17′32″W
  - elevation: 274 ft (84 m)
- Length: 93 mi (150 km)
- Basin size: 928 sq mi (2,400 km^{2})
- Discharge
  - location: Burtonsville
  - minimum: 2.4 cu ft/s (0.068 m^{3}/s)
  - maximum: 128,000 cu ft/s (3,600 m^{3}/s)

Basin features
- Progression: Schoharie Creek → Mohawk River → Hudson River → Upper New York Bay
- Tributaries
  - left: West Kill, Panther Creek, Cobleskill Creek
  - right: East Kill, Batavia Kill, Little Schoharie Creek, Fox Creek

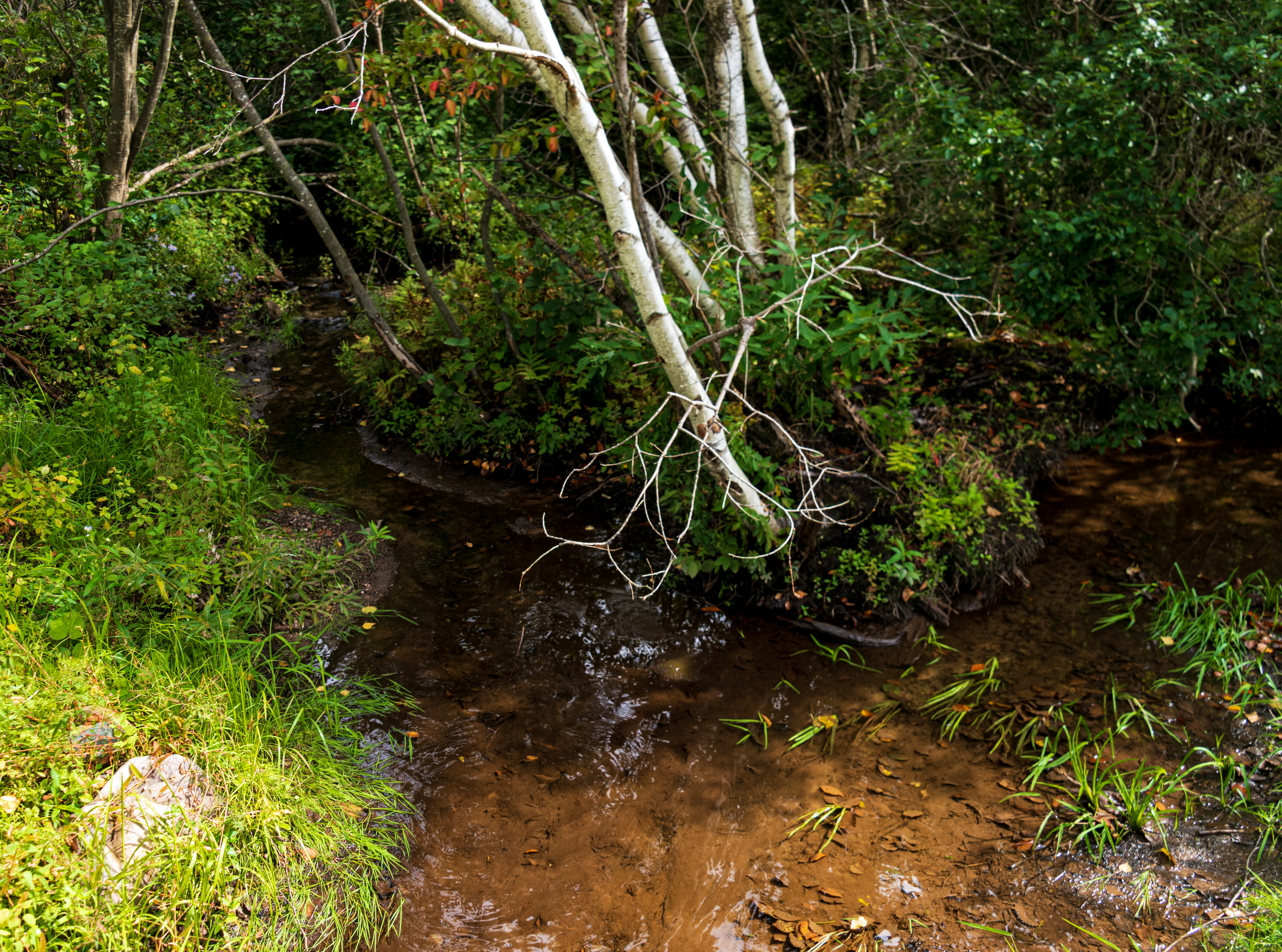
Source of Schoharie Creek in the Catskills

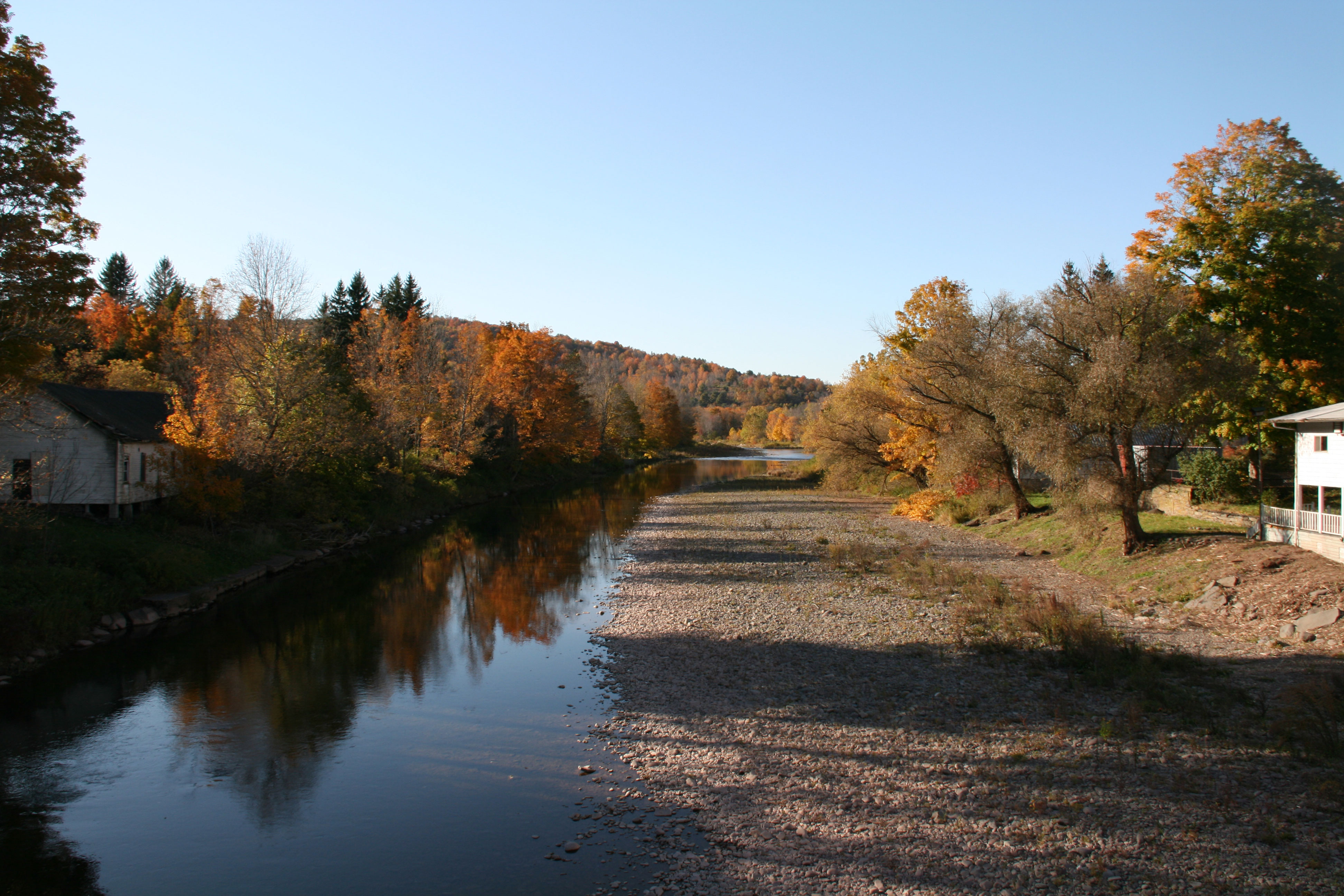
An autumn view of Schoharie Creek, facing northwest from the Schoharie Creek bridge

Schoharie Creek is a river in New York that flows north 93 miles (150 km) from the foot of Indian Head Mountain in the Catskills through the Schoharie Valley to the Mohawk River. It is twice impounded north of Prattsville to create New York City's Schoharie Reservoir and the Blenheim-Gilboa Power Project.

The Erie Canal crossed over the creek by an aqueduct at Schoharie Crossing State Historic Site.

Two notable bridge collapses have occurred on Schoharie Creek. In 1987, two spans of the New York State Thruway collapsed. On August 28, 2011, the covered Old Blenheim Bridge collapsed due to flooding from Hurricane Irene.

== Geography ==
=== Watershed and tributary streams ===
Schoharie Creek is part of the drainage system of the Hudson River watershed and a direct tributary of the Mohawk River. Tributaries of Schoharie Creek, listed from upstream to downstream, include:

==== East side ====
- Gooseberry Creek
- Red Kill
- East Kill
- John Chase Brook
- Batavia Kill
- Hunterfield Creek
- Platter Kill
- Keyser Kill
- Little Schoharie Creek
- Stony Brook
- Fox Creek
- Bowman Creek

==== West side ====
- Roaring Kill
- Cook Brook
- West Kill
- Little West Kill
- Johnson Hollow Brook
- Bear Kill
- Mine Kill
- West Kill
- Cole Brook
- Panther Creek
- Pleasant Valley Creek
- Line Creek
- Cobleskill Creek
- Cripplebush Creek
- Fly Creek
- Wilsey Creek
- Irish Creek

== Watershed ==
Before European colonization, the watershed was mostly forested with a few small areas cleared by Native Americans for hunting. Early European settlers attempted to farm the land, but soon abandoned it due to the short growing seasons, steep slopes and rocky soil. Between 1800 and the early 1900s, mills, the tanning industry, quarrying for bluestone, logging, railroads, and resorts cleared the Catskills of most of its forest cover.

Starting in the early 1900s, these industries began to decline and areas that were previously cleared have grown back into forest. As of 2001, approximately 85% of the Schoharie Creek's watershed has been classified as forested.

== Hydrology ==
=== Water quality ===
New York's Department of Environmental Conservation (DEC) rates the water quality of Schoharie Creek in different sections. The section from Cobleskill Creek to Pleasant Valley Brook is rated Class C, which is most suitable for fishing, but can also be suitable for primary and secondary contact recreation.

Stream flow on the lower Schoharie is significantly influenced by the Schoharie Reservoir. Flow from the reservoir is restricted when the dam is not open, and the lack of flow mostly during the summer increases water temperature, which negatively affects the fishery. Also this section flows through an agricultural valley, which contributes to increased sediment in the creek. This increases streambank erosion and sediment loadings, and during high flows, cause the creek's turbidity to increase. Biological tests were conducted in Fort Hunter in 2001, then in Burtonsville in 2001, and showed non-impacted water quality conditions at both sites.

=== Discharge ===
The United States Geological Survey (USGS) maintains many stream gauges along Schoharie Creek. The first station is 1.2 miles (1.9 km) east of Lexington in operation since 1999, had a maximum discharge of 40,500 cubic feet (1,150 m^{3}) per second on August 28, 2011, as Hurricane Irene passed through the area, and a minimum discharge of 4.8 cubic feet (0.14 m^{3}) per second on August 21–22, 2002. Another station by Prattsville in operation since 1902, 0.2 miles (0.32 km) upstream from Schoharie Reservoir, had a maximum discharge of 120,000 cubic feet (3,400 m^{3}) per second on August 28, 2011, with no minimum discharge recorded.

Below the Schoharie Reservoir is the station by Gilboa in operation since October 1975, 0.5 miles (0.80 km) downstream from the Schoharie Reservoir dam, had a maximum discharge of 111,000 cubic feet (3,100 m^{3}) per second on August 28, 2011, and a minimum discharge of 0.04 cubic feet (0.0011 m^{3}) per second on many days from June to October 1976, and September 11–13, 1980. Another station by North Blenheim in operation continuously since October 1970, 1.2 miles (1.9 km) upstream from bridge on State Highway 30 in North Blenheim, had a maximum discharge of 111,000 cubic feet (3,100 m^{3}) per second on August 28, 2011, and a minimum discharge of 0.04 cubic feet (0.0011 m^{3}) per second on many days from June to October 1976, and September 11–13, 1980. The station by Breakabeen in operation since July 1975, 1.1 miles (1.8 km) downstream from Keyser Kill, had a maximum discharge of 134,000 cubic feet (3,800 m^{3}) per second on August 28, 2011, and a minimum discharge of 1.7 cubic feet (0.048 m^{3}) per second on October 14, 1988.

Graph from Burtonsville USGS stream gauge showing rise in discharge after Tropical Storm Irene

Further downstream the station by Middleburgh in operation from July 1927 to September 1939 and since December 2017, slightly downstream of the bridge at intersection of State Highways 30 and 145 in Middleburgh, had a maximum discharge of 47,800 cubic feet (1,350 m^{3}) per second on March 18, 1936, and a minimum discharge of 2 cubic feet (0.057 m^{3}) per second on September 1, 1939. Outside the period of record, it had an estimated maximum discharge of 130,000 cubic feet (3,700 m^{3}) per second on August 28, 2011. The station in Schoharie is located upstream from bridge on County Highway 1A has been in operation since December 2017, takes gauge height measurements only. It had a maximum gauge height of 13.42 feet (4.09 m) on August 14, 2018, and a minimum gage height of 4.47 feet (1.36 m) on many days between September 22 and October 1, 2019. The station in Esperance is located by the US Route 20 bridge has been in operation since December 2017, takes gauge height measurements only. It had a maximum gauge height of 10.85 feet (3.31 m) on April 15, 2019, and a minimum gage height of 0.78 feet (0.24 m) on July 22, 2018. Outside the period of record, the flood of August 2011 reached a stage of 33.70 feet (10.27 m) from floodmark. The station in Burtonsville in operation since October 1939, 15 miles (24 km) upstream from the mouth, had a maximum discharge of 128,000 cubic feet (3,600 m^{3}) per second on August 29, 2011, and a minimum discharge of 2.4 cubic feet (0.068 m^{3}) per second on September 24–25, 1964.

=== Turbidity ===
The USGS station along the creek near Burtonsville, collects turbidity data every 15 minutes. The maximum daily suspended sediment concentrations (SSC) mean was 1460 mg/L on June 14, 2013, and the minimum was 2 mg/L on October 1–2, 2014. On June 14, 2013, the maximum daily suspended sediment discharge was 48,400 tons (43,900,000 kg) on June 14, 2013, and .16 tons (150 kg) on October 1–2, 2014.

== History ==
In the 18th century, areas of the south (or right bank) side of Mohawk Valley were sparsely settled in the face of the periodically warlike and always militant Iroquois peoples, who, while diminished by European diseases during colonial times still retained ample war powers after the French and Indian War ended in 1763. Reorganized by then as the Six Nations the tribes had conducted internecine war with other powerful eastern tribes until the 1770s, weakening or eliminating the power of the Delaware, the Susquehanna, and Shawnee tribes— affecting Amerindian populations and power both East and West of the Alleghenies as far south as northern Kentucky in the west, and southern Maryland in the east. By the end of the French and Indian War, they were the one remaining group of eastern native peoples that retained sufficient military power to give even the British authorities pause. Consequently, those authorities cultivated political arrangements with the Iroquois and as a prelude to the revolution, the British Crown acted to block trans-Appalachian settlements before the opening of the American Revolution, one of the lesser known grievances of many held by the settlers.

During the Revolution, farms in the valley acted as a breadbasket providing important food supplies to the Colonial forces. The lower Mohawk valley was a scene of uneasy native Amerindian–Colonial Settler contention throughout most of the 18th century until after the American Revolutionary War's Sullivan Expedition pacified the region by permanently weakening the Six Nations of the Iroquois. That campaign was a direct result of two atrocities in the region: The May 1778 Battle of Cobleskill (or Cobleskill Creek Massacre) signaled a new guerrilla war offensive by mixed troops of Loyalists and members of the four Iroquois tribes allied to the British in 1778. The incursions resulted in three major raids with major loss of life ranging from Southern New York to Wilkes-Barre, Pennsylvania.

=== New York State Thruway bridge collapse ===
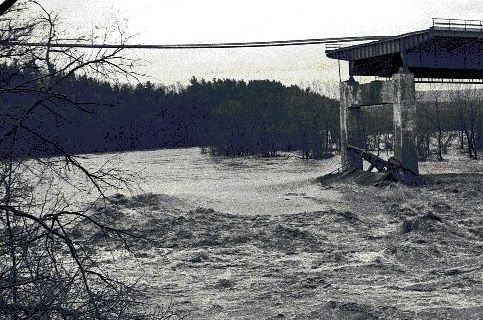

On the morning of April 5, 1987, after 30 years of service, two spans of the New York State Thruway bridge over Schoharie Creek near Fort Hunter collapsed. Five vehicles fell into the flooded river, resulting in ten deaths. A subsequent investigation of the collapse determined the cause to be scour. At the time, the creek was higher and flowing faster than normal due to excessive rains in the area. Twelve hours before the Schoharie Creek Bridge collapsed due to heavy rainfall, the rush of water through the Blenheim-Gilboa Pumped Storage Power Project 40 miles (64 km) upstream hit a historic high. To cope with the overload, the dam released water into the Schoharie Creek according to the rate at which it was entering the reservoir from upstream, adding to the load in the creek. The segment of NY 5S near Fort Hunter was reconfigured to carry westbound Thruway traffic while the bridge was rebuilt. The eastbound replacement bridge was completed and fully open to traffic on December 7, 1987, and the westbound replacement bridge was opened on May 21, 1988.

=== Old Blenheim Bridge ===
The Old Blenheim Bridge, one of the longest and oldest single-span covered bridges in the world, formerly spanned the creek. The bridge was destroyed on August 28, 2011, by flooding resulting from Hurricane Irene.

== See also ==
- Colonel's Chair, a mountain adjacent to the upper reach
- List of rivers in New York
