= Fort Hunter, New York =

Hamlet in New York

Coordinates: 42°56′32″N 74°17′06″W

Fort Hunter is a hamlet in the town of Florida in Montgomery County, New York, United States, west of the capital at Albany, on the south bank of the Mohawk River and on the northeast bank of Schoharie Creek.

The hamlet, developed around a fort of the same name, was built by English colonists in 1712 near the Mohawk village of Tionondoroge for their defense. Queen Anne ordered the fort built at the request of the Mohawk, in exchange for their allowing her to settle German Palatines in their territory. The English called the Mohawk settlement the Lower Mohawk Castle. Within a few years, the fort included an Anglican chapel, first built in logs and replaced by a stone church in 1741. It was a mission church for the Mohawk in addition to English settlers. The fort survived the wars in the region; it was taken down in 1820 to make way for construction of the Erie Canal.

== History ==
=== Land deed ===
The Fort Hunter land, approximately 80 acres on both sides of the mouth of the Schoharie, was deeded in 1697 to Jan Peterse Mabee. He had an advantage because his wife, Anna Borsboom, apparently of mixed race, was "something related to the Indian castle". The deed was signed by Sachem Rode of the Wolf Clan. In order to build the fort, there was a land swap, with the Mabee family receiving land further south on Schoharie Creek. Copies of the deed are held both in the Albany State Archives and at the shrine of Saint Kateri Tekakwitha in nearby Auriesville, New York.

=== Palatine settlement ===
Fort Hunter and Queen Anne's Chapel around 1711

The site of future Fort Hunter was on Schoharie Creek, near the easternmost of the two primary Mohawk settlements of the time. It was in part for defense of the nearby Mohawk village against the French and their Indian allies.

The Mohawk name for their village was rendered variously in English as Tionondoroge, Teantontalago, Thienderego, Tionondorage, and Tiononderoga. The European colonists also called it the Lower Mohawk Castle, referring to its relative position near the Mohawk River, which flows east. Canajoharie, the other primary Mohawk village, was known as the Upper Mohawk Castle and was located further west upriver, also on the south side of the river. By the Dongan Charter, the city of Albany acquired the right to own 1,000 acres (4.0 km^{2}) at the Lower Mohawk Castle.

Hendrick Tejonihokarawa of the Wolf Clan, a Mohawk Royaner also known by the English as Hendrick Peters, was one of the "Four Mohawk Kings" who went to London in 1710 to meet with Queen Anne. The chiefs asked her for Anglican missionaries to help offset French Catholic influence in the Haudenosaunee Confederacy, as well as for defenses against French soldiers. In 1711, the Crown authorized the construction of Fort Hunter near Tionondorage for such defense. The fort contained a chapel and mission house. Queen Anne donated a set of communion silver and sent two missionaries to the colony.

In return, she asked Tejonihokarawa for help in settling Palatine Germans, Protestant refugees then working at English camps in the Hudson Valley in present-day Dutchess County. They had left the Palatine because of French invasions related to religious wars. Through Governor Hunter, the sachem made some Mohawk land available to settlers near Schoharie Creek, where some of the Palatines eventually settled.

=== Fort Hunter ===
Fort Hunter was constructed by English colonists in 1712.

In 1723, some 100 heads of German households were granted land in what was known as the Burnetsfield Patent, west of the rapids at Little Falls. They were a buffer between the French and Iroquois, and the English settlements.

A log cabin was erected for use as a chapel, and at one time there were 30 houses for Mohawk within the fort. The log structure was replaced with a stone church in 1741 and a parsonage was later built outside the fort; it still stands. The fort was used by area residents for defense in the French and Indian War, and during the American Revolution.

=== Erie Canal ===
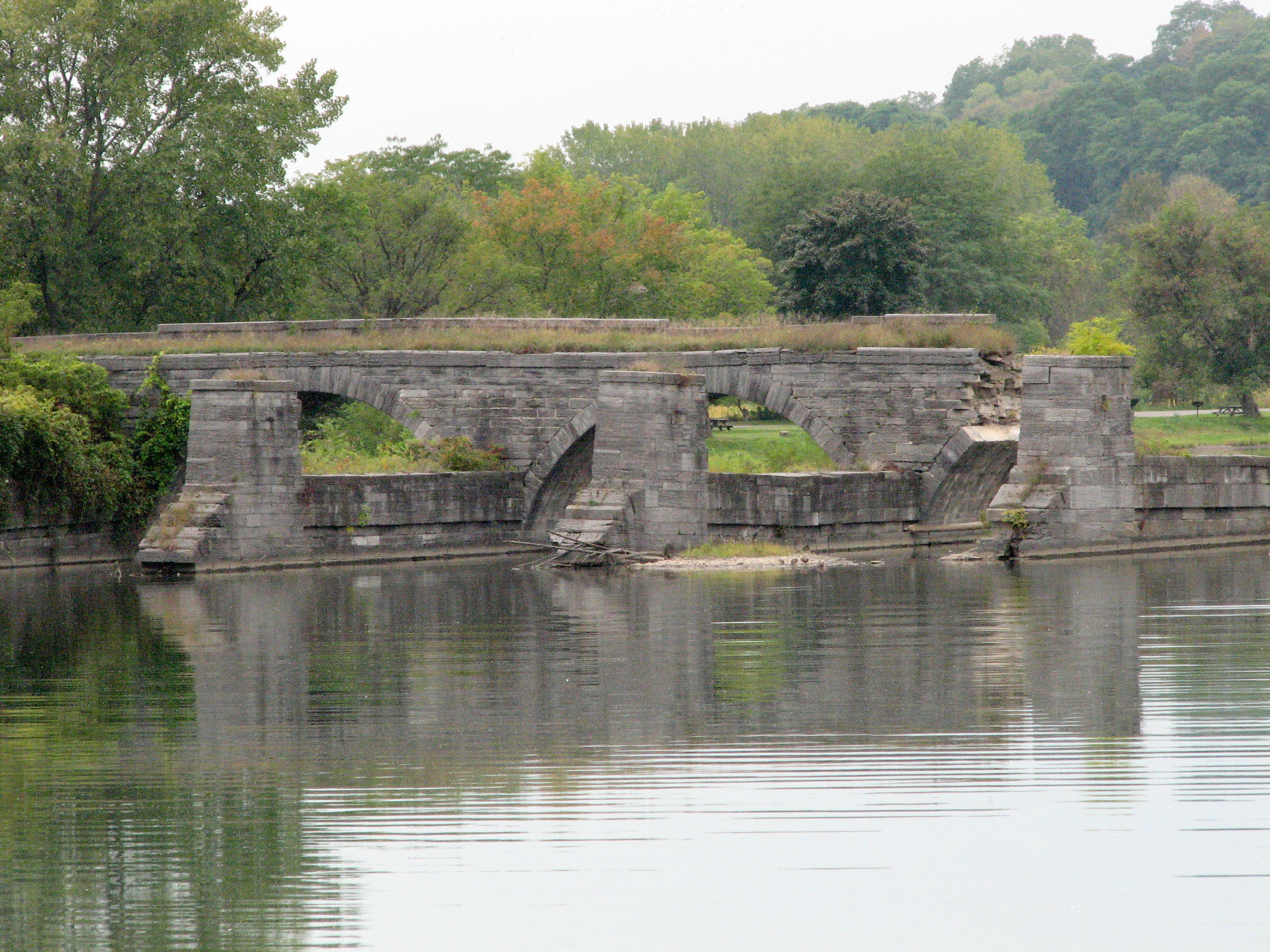
Erie Canal aqueduct at Fort Hunter, NY

In 1820, the fort and church were taken down to make way for construction of the Erie Canal, which dramatically increased trade and traffic through the valley.

== Today ==
Today, the hamlet of Fort Hunter is the location of the Schoharie Crossing State Historic Site. It includes the remains of the Schoharie Crossing, a navigable aqueduct over the creek, and part of a lock from the early nineteenth-century development of the Erie Canal along the Mohawk River.
