= Eliza Daniel Stewart =

American early temperance movement leader

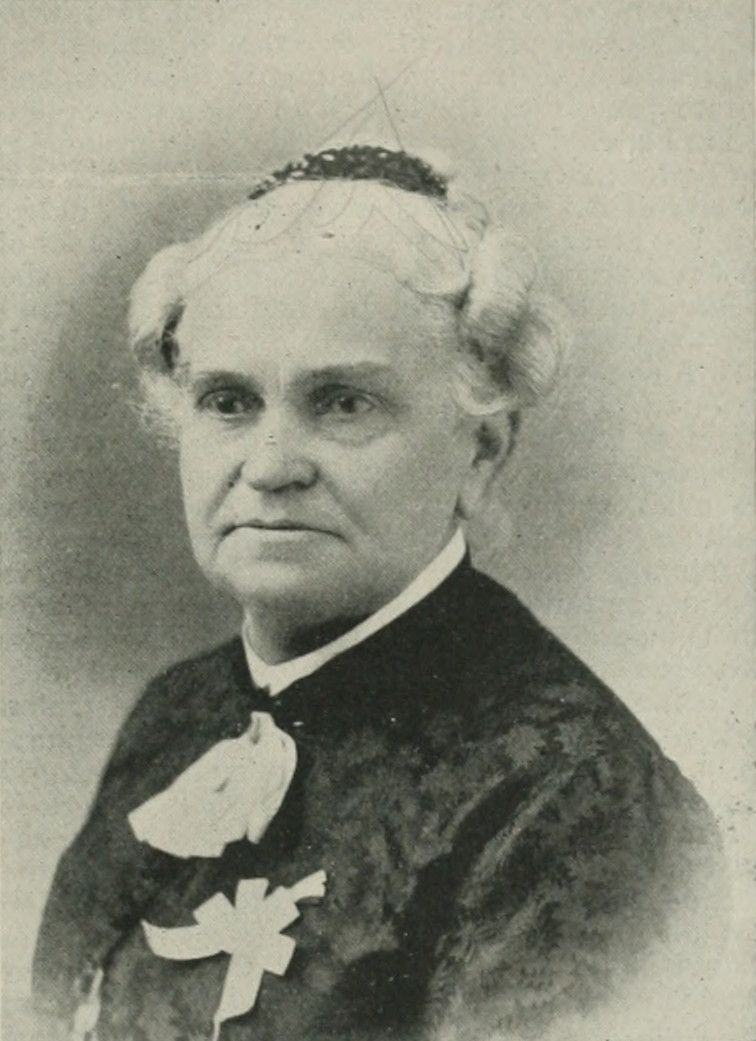
- Born: April 25, 1816; Piketon
- Died: August 6, 1908 (aged 92); Hicksville

Eliza Daniel Stewart (April 25, 1816 – August 6, 1908) was an American early temperance movement leader from Springfield, Ohio. She was popularly known as "Mother Stewart".

== Biography ==
Eliza Daniel Stewart was born in Piketon, Ohio on April 25, 1816.

Stewart began her career in public service during the American Civil War, working with the Soldiers' Aid Societies and the United States Sanitary Commission.

At the conclusion of the war, she and her husband Hiram Stewart moved to Springfield, Ohio. In January 1872, Stewart delivered a lecture entitled "The Liquor Traffic and How to Avoid It" at Allen's Hall in Springfield, Ohio. Afterward, the editor of the Springfield Republic suggested she encourage the wives of heavy to prosecute saloonkeepers under the Adair law. The Adair law provided that "a wife, child, parent, guardian or employer of an intoxicated person, who has been injured in person, property, or means of support by such intoxication, could sue the individual who by furnishing the requisite liquor, was said to have 'caused' the intoxication, for damages both exemplary and actual". Days later, Stewart made an impassioned plea on behalf of a destitute woman in an Adair case. The court awarded the woman $100 plus costs. For her second Adair case in October 1873, Stewart took a more active room in the courtroom and the plaintiff was awarded $300.

Stewart was a key figure in the Women's Crusade of 1873–74. The Crusades began in Hillsboro, Ohio a speech given by Dr. Diocletian Lewis on December 23, 1873. Lewis told the story of how his mother, distressed by her husband's drinking, appealed to the owner of the local saloon to cease selling liquor by praying with a group of other women. The women were successful and the saloonkeeper closed his business. In response to this story, the women of Hillsboro marched through the town, stopping at every saloon (approximately twenty of them) and praying for the souls of the barkeepers and their patrons. The women asked the owners to sign a pledge to no longer sell alcohol. By 1875, more than 130 other communities around the state had also had experienced marches–a period often known locally as the “Ohio Whiskey War".

Richard H. Chused described the Crusade as follows: "Leaving the sanctuary of their homes, they carried an aura of moral responsibility and upright character with them as they entered bars filled with smoking and imbibing men and prayed on the streets in front of drinking establishments for weeks on end. Many men were incredulous that the respectable women of southern Ohio were capable of organizing daily prayer sessions and well-orchestrated marches into male domains".

Stewart founded the Women's Temperance League of Osborn, Ohio, in 1873. Stewart helped to found the Woman's Christian Temperance Union in 1874 and the Osborn organization became the first local chapter of the new national organization.

She visited the United Kingdom in 1876, and helped organize the British Women's Temperance Association.

She died at her home in Hicksville, Ohio on August 6, 1908 and was buried in Ferncliff Cemetery in Springfield, Ohio on August 10, 1908.
