= Eliza Thompson =

American temperance activist (1816–1905)

Eliza Jane Thompson
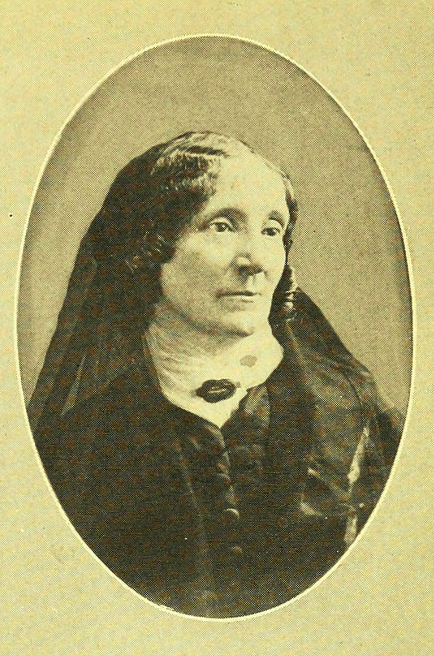
- Thompson in a 1924 publication.
- Born: Eliza Jane Trimble; August 24, 1816; Hillsboro, Ohio
- Died: November 3, 1905 (aged 89); Hillsboro, Ohio
- Known for: Temperance movement

Eliza Jane Trimble Thompson (1816–1905) was a temperance advocate.

== Biography ==
Eliza Jane Trimble was born in Hillsboro, Ohio, August 24, 1816. The daughter of Governor Allen Trimble, Thompson was inspired by a December 23, 1873 lecture by Diocletian Lewis to begin leading groups of women into saloons where they sang hymns and prayed for the closure of the establishments. These direct, non-violent “Visitation Bands” were successful and quickly spread first across the state of Ohio and then to a total of 22 other states from New York to California. Dr. Lewis, a minister who had a drunken father which contributed to his desire for temperance and abstinence, believed that women needed to be educated on the social evils of alcohol.

"Mother Thompson" and others claimed often dramatic conversions by saloon keepers. In other cases, the retailers simply gave up after being picked on for weeks by the Visitation Bands.

Within several years the movement subsided. However, it was successful in stimulating the temperance movement, which had declined with the outbreak of the Civil War (1861–1865). The Woman's Christian Temperance Union (WCTU) traces its origins to the Women's Crusade against alcohol.

Thompson died on November 3, 1905, in Hillsboro.

== Gallery ==
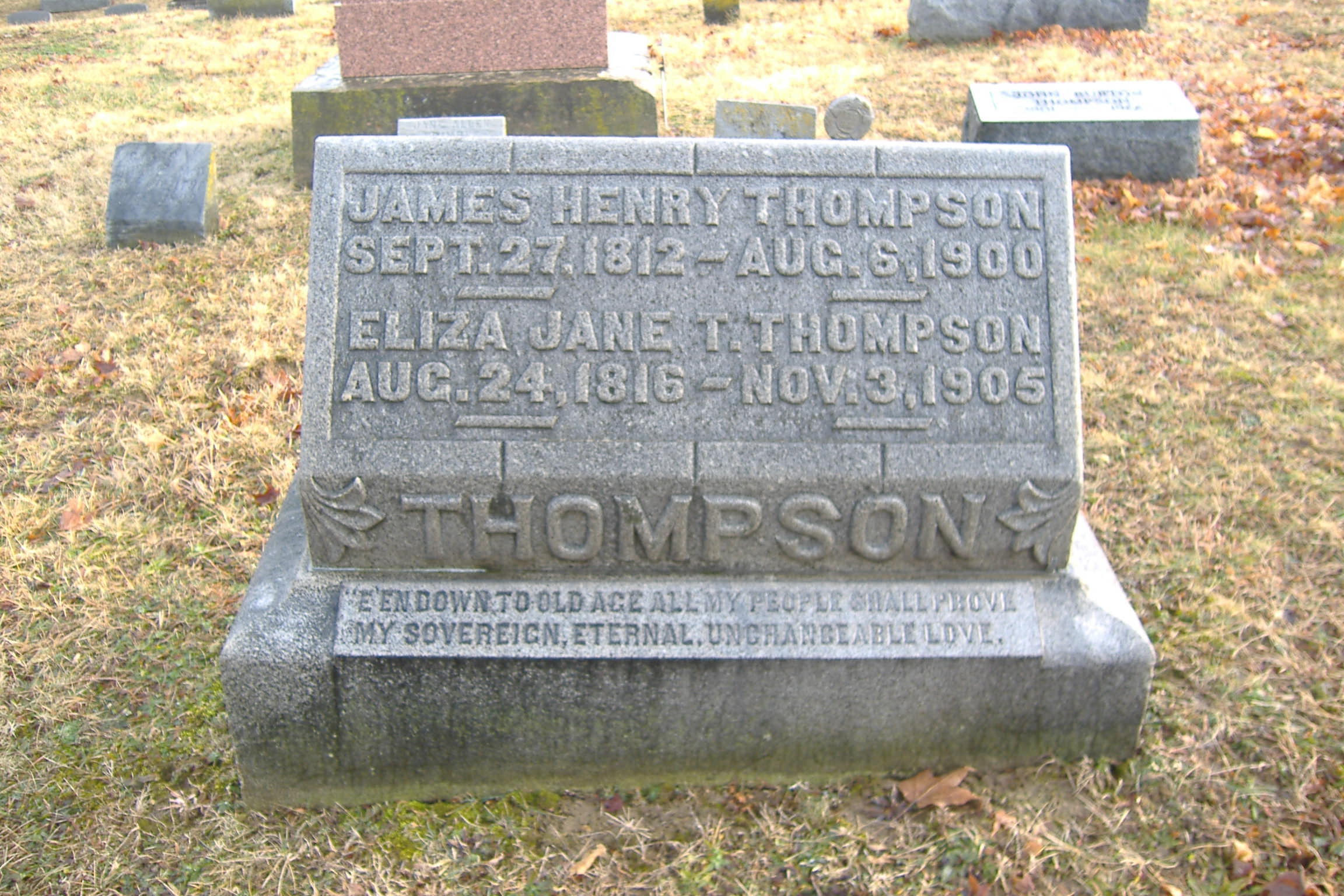
Headstone of Eliza Jane Thompson and her husband James Henry Thompson at Hillsboro Cemetery in Hillsboro, Ohio.

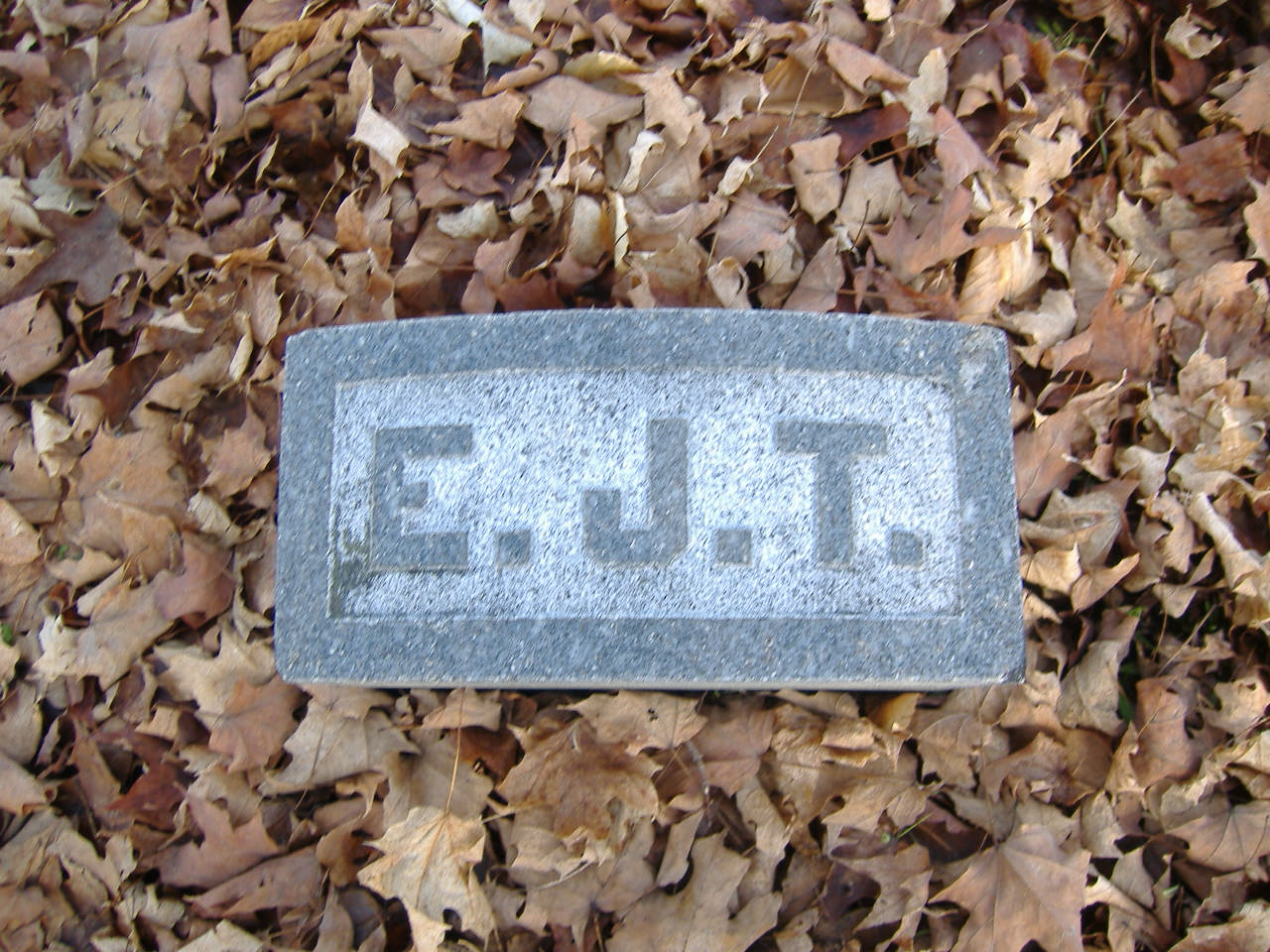
Gravemarker of Eliza Thompson.

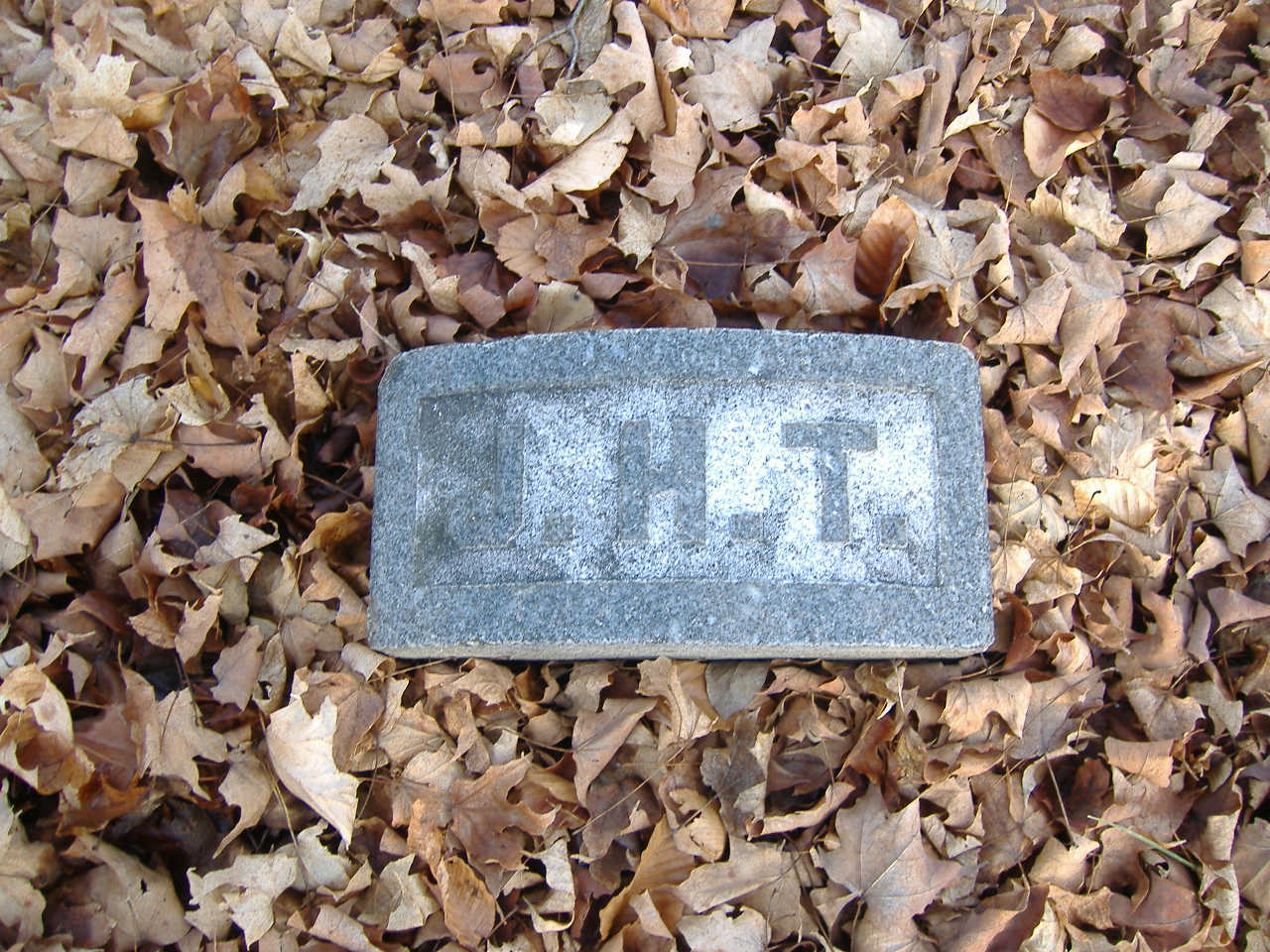
Gravemarker of James Henry Thompson.

== Sources ==
- Phebe A. Hanaford (1883), Daughters of America, Augusta, Me: True and Co., OCLC 5295349, OL 7239181M
- Eliza Jane Trimble Thompson (1906), Hillsboro crusade sketches and family records (Hillsboro crusade sketches and family records. ed.), Cincinnati: Jennings and Graham, OCLC 3029347, OL 6976862M
