= Carlisle, New York =

Carlisle
- Town
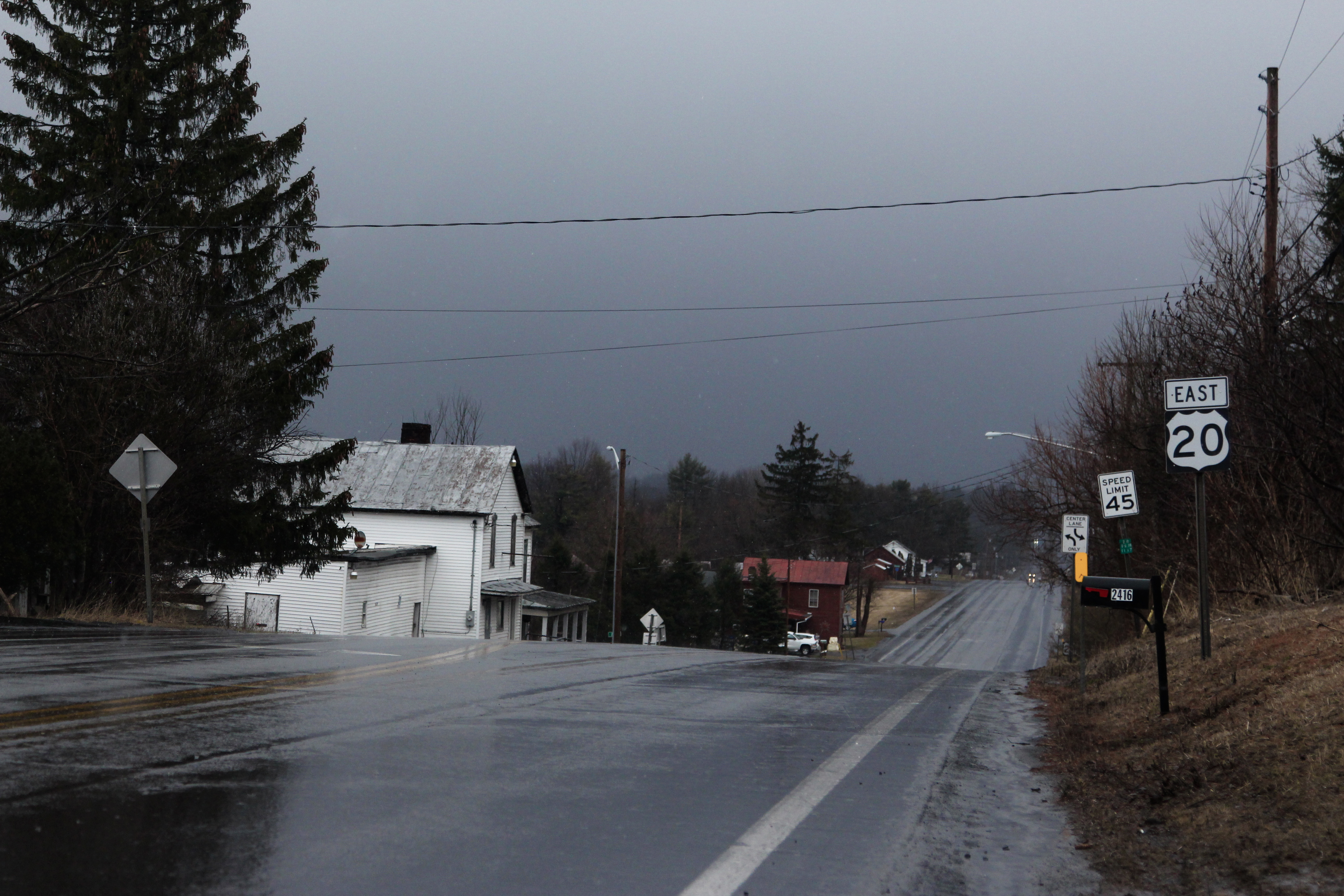
- U.S. Route 20 in Carlisle, New York.

- Location in Schoharie County and the state of New York.
- Coordinates: 42°45′50″N 74°26′5″W
- Country: United States
- State: New York
- County: Schoharie

Area
  - Total: 34.25 sq mi (88.70 km^{2})
  - Land: 34.12 sq mi (88.36 km^{2})
  - Water: 0.13 sq mi (0.33 km^{2})
- Elevation: 1,263 ft (385 m)

Population (2020)
  - Total: 1,768
- Time zone: UTC-5 (Eastern (EST))
  - Summer (DST): UTC-4 (EDT)
- ZIP code: 12031
- Area code: 518
- FIPS code: 36-12452
- GNIS feature ID: 0978791

Carlisle is a town in northern Schoharie County, New York, United States. The population was 1,768 at the 2020 census.

== History ==
The town was first settled circa 1760.

The town of Carlisle was established in 1807 from the towns of Cobleskill and Sharon. According to William Roscoe's History of Scholarie County, the town was named after Carlisle Pierce, a resident of the town.

Manufacturing plows was a town industry in the 19th century.

== Geography ==
According to the United States Census Bureau, the town has a total area of 34.2 square miles (89 km^{2}), of which 34.2 square miles (89 km^{2}) is land and 0.1 square miles (0.26 km^{2}) (0.26%) is water.

The northern town line is the border of Montgomery County, southwest of Amsterdam.

U.S. Route 20 (US 20; Cherry Valley Turnpike) is an east–west highway across the town. New York State Route 162 crosses the northeastern corner of Carlisle.

== Demographics ==
Historical population
Census	Pop.	Note	%±
1820	1,583		—
1830	1,748		10.4%
1840	1,850		5.8%
1850	1,817		−1.8%
1860	1,760		−3.1%
1870	1,730		−1.7%
1880	1,720		−0.6%
1890	1,349		−21.6%
1900	1,225		−9.2%
1910	1,024		−16.4%
1920	861		−15.9%
1930	796		−7.5%
1940	917		15.2%
1950	1,010		10.1%
1960	900		−10.9%
1970	1,040		15.6%
1980	1,417		36.3%
1990	1,672		18.0%
2000	1,758		5.1%
2010	1,948		10.8%
2020	1,768		−9.2%
U.S. Decennial Census

As of the census of 2000, there were 1,758 people, 628 households, and 476 families residing in the town. The population density was 51.5 inhabitants per square mile (19.9/km^{2}). There were 728 housing units at an average density of 21.3 per square mile (8.2/km^{2}). The racial makeup of the town was 97.61% White, 0.40% African American, 0.51% Native American, 0.28% Asian, 0.06% Pacific Islander, 0.28% from other races, and 0.85% from two or more races. Hispanic or Latino of any race were 2.33% of the population.

There were 628 households, out of which 39.3% had children under the age of 18 living with them, 60.5% were married couples living together, 10.7% had a female householder with no husband present, and 24.2% were non-families. 18.0% of all households were made up of individuals, and 6.5% had someone living alone who was 65 years of age or older. The average household size was 2.80 and the average family size was 3.16.

In the town, the population was spread out, with 29.7% under the age of 18, 7.5% from 18 to 24, 30.3% from 25 to 44, 23.2% from 45 to 64, and 9.2% who were 65 years of age or older. The median age was 35 years. For every 100 females, there were 100.0 males. For every 100 females age 18 and over, there were 100.8 males.

The median income for a household in the town was $43,657, and the median income for a family was $48,095. Males had a median income of $32,188 versus $23,646 for females. The per capita income for the town was $17,767. About 7.9% of families and 8.4% of the population were below the poverty line, including 11.4% of those under age 18 and 7.9% of those age 65 or over.

== Communities and locations in Carlisle ==
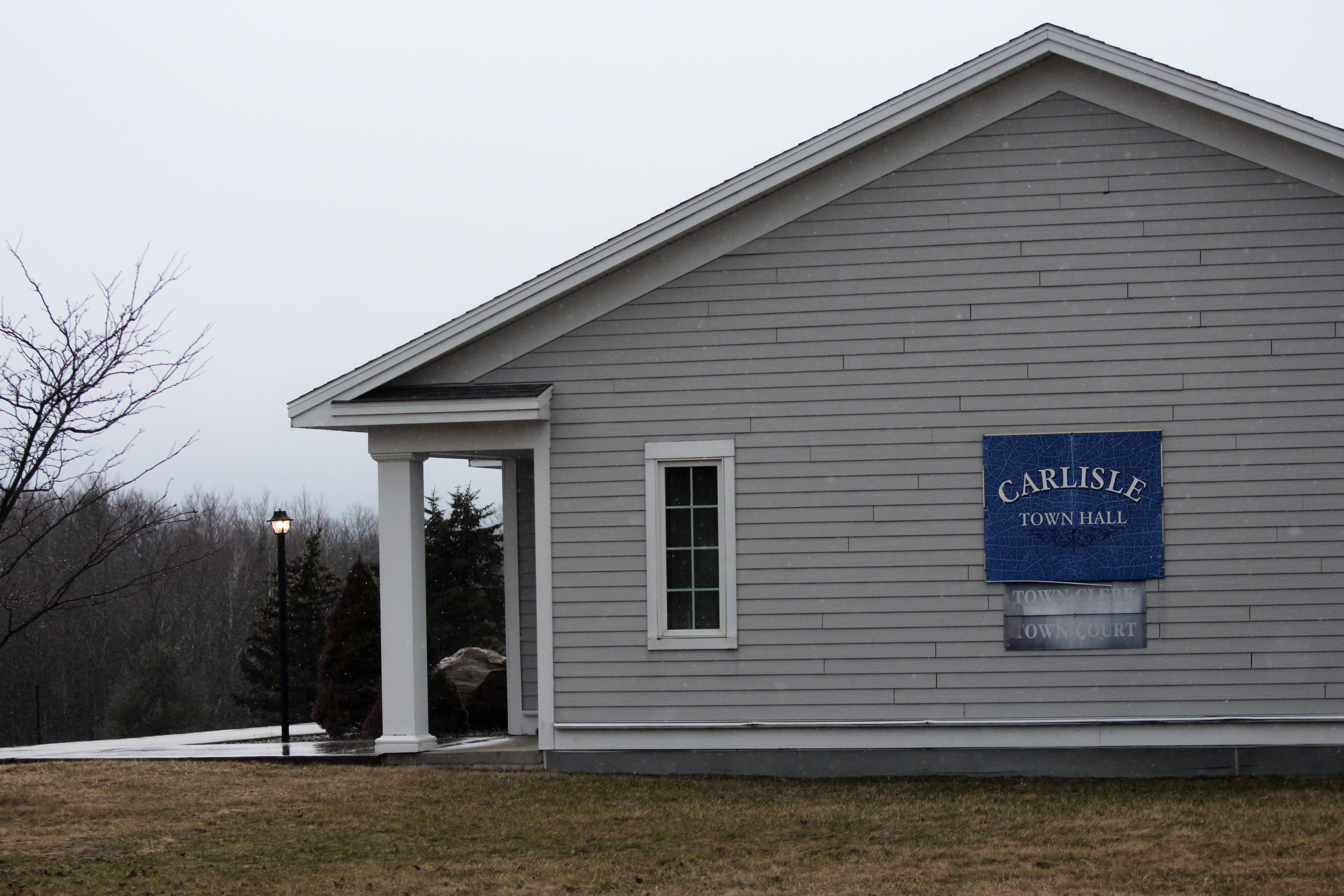
Carlisle Town Hall

- Argusville – A location in the northwestern corner of the town on the town line.
- Bear Swamp – A bog north of Little York.
- Becker Corners – A hamlet in the southeastern corner of the town at Cripplebush Creek.
- Carlisle – A hamlet on US 20.
- Carlisle Center – A hamlet near the southern town line on County Route 10 (CR 10), south of Carlisle hamlet.
- Cripplebush Creek – A stream flowing out the eastern town boundary to Schoharie Creek.
- Grovenor Corners – A hamlet on CR 10 in the southeastern part of the town.
- Little York – A hamlet on US 20 at the western side of the town.
- Russell Lake – A small lake on the town line in the southwestern part of Carlisle.

== Notable people ==
- Esther Lord McNeill (1812–1907), temperance movement leader
- John Snyders Kenyon (1843–1902), Civil War Medal of Honor recipient
