= Harriet C. McCabe =

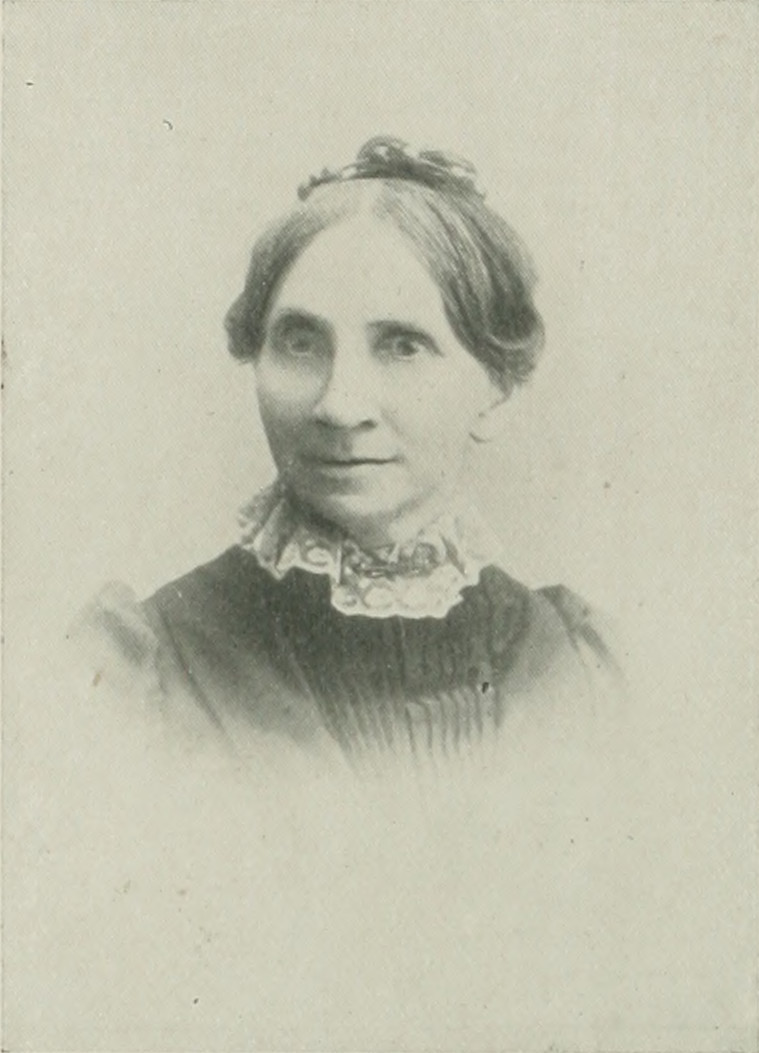
Portrait photograph from A Woman of the Century

Harriet Calista Clark McCabe (January 19, 1827 – September 25, 1919) was an American pioneer in women's work for temperance and home missions. She took a responsible position in the formation of the Woman's Christian Temperance Union (WCTU) in the period immediately following the Women's Crusade. She was the first president of the Ohio WCTU; she gave the organization its name, and drafted its Constitution. McCabe favored equal suffrage.

== Early life and education ==
Harriet Calista Clark was born in Sidney, New York, January 19, 1827. Her parents were Arvine and Eliza F. (Clark) Clark. They were devout members of the Methodist Episcopal Church (MEC). McCabe was reared on a farm.

Until the age of 12, she was educated either in the district school or by private governess. She became a fluent French scholar before she was ten years of age, and delighted in the scientific study of plants. When she was 12, her parents moved to Elmira, New York. She was educated at that city's Elmira Academy and under private tutors at home.

At the age of 20, she converted to the MEC.

== Career ==
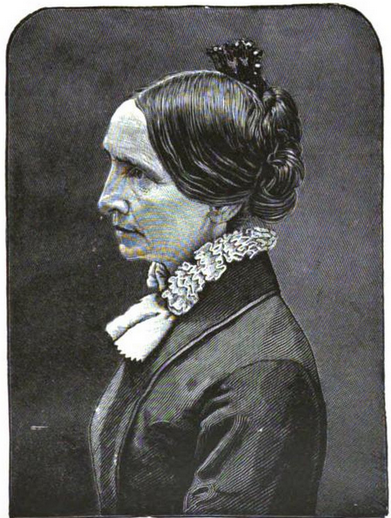
Harriet Calista Clark McCabe (1882)

In 1851, she became preceptress of Dickinson Seminary (now Lycoming College), Williamsport, Pennsylvania, serving until 1857, when she married the Rev. Lorenzo Dow McCabe, D.D., LL..D., professor of philosophy in Ohio Wesleyan University, Delaware, Ohio. From then, her home was in that city.

Following addresses of Dr. Dio Lewis at Hillsboro and Washington Court House, in the latter part of December 1873. the women of both communities effected an organization to visit the saloons in their respective towns, to hold religious services, and to plead with the saloon-keepers to sign the pledge and abandon the liquor-selling business.

In April 1874, McCabe wrote the constitution of the Ohio WCTU, which was the first union organized. That constitution was accepted by the organizing committee, which represented the State and which proposed the name, "Woman's Christian Temperance Union". The State convention met in June in Springfield, Ohio, and ratified the convention and accepted the name. The convention was held in the Evangelical Lutheran Church of Springfield, but the William Street MEC, in Delaware, Ohio, claims the honor of having the organizing work done and the name of the great organization given within its building.

As the official head of the Ohio WCTU, McCabe presided over the National Convention held in Cleveland on November 18–20, 1874, and made the address of welcome to the representatives of 18 States who formed the National WCTU. The National WCTU accepted the constitution of the Ohio WCTU, with the requisite modifications. It also accepted the name. She served as President of the Ohio WCTU for five years.

McCabe retired from serving as President of the Ohio WCTU in order to give more time to responsibilities which had been laid upon her in connection with the missionary enterprises of the MEC. For 18 years, she was editor of Woman's Home Missions and secretary of the Indian Bureau of the Home Missionary Society.

She wrote fugitive newspaper articles and leaflets on current interests.

== Personal life ==
She married Lorenzo Dow McCabe (1817–1897), professor of mathematics and afterwards of philosophy in the Ohio Wesleyan University, Delaware, Ohio.

She had at least three children: John Jay McCabe (1859–1933), Robert Lorenzo McCabe (1863–1937) and Calista McCabe Courtenay (1868–1936).

In politics, she was a member of the Progressive Party.

On January 19, 1919, McCabe's friends met at her home in Delaware to celebrate her 92nd birthday. An address was delivered by former Governor Frank B. Willis, and then, by request of the assembled company, McCabe told once more the familiar story of the founding of the WCTU. She died in Delaware, Ohio, September 25, 1919, and is buried in that city's Oak Grove Cemetery.
