= Edward Clemens Lord =

Edward Clemens Lord (or Edward C. Lord, D.D.) (1817–1887) was a Baptist missionary to China during the late Qing dynasty.

== Early life ==
Lord was born at Carlisle, New York, January 22, 1817.

His father was a Connecticut Yankee, his mother a native of Massachusetts. Edward had nine siblings, including a sister, Esther Lord McNeill, a temperance movement leader, who cared for Edward's children while he worked in China.

He was a graduate of the Hamilton Literary & Theological Institution.

== Career ==
He was ordained at Preston Hollow, N.Y., August 27, 1846, having previously received an appointment as a missionary to China. He reached Ningbo on June 20, 1847. He worked with Dr. Macgowan in the care of that station.

Having acquired the language, he was able to preach to the natives and converse with them on religious subjects. His wife's health required him to return to the US, which he reached at the close of 1851. After a little less than two years, he returned to Ningbo. Arriving June 1, 1854, he resumed his missionary labors, alongside Knowlton.

== Writing ==
Lord also performed some work in his study. Writing to the executive committee, in 1860, he noted, "My notes on the Epistles to the Hebrews and Romans have been completed, and considerable other labor of a similar kind has been performed." The next year he wrote, "My notes on the First Epistle to the Corinthians have been completed and put to press. My notes on Ephesians have been carefully revised, and those on Second Corinthians are in course of preparation." In 1863 he wrote, "At [Ningbo], in my own neighborhood, I have plenty of work, and I am thankful to say there is much encouragement. At the communion season, about three months ago, I baptized five persons, three men and two women, and I have at present several applicants."

== Diplomat ==
In July, 1864 he entered the diplomatic service of the United States in China, and performed less of missionary service for several years. His formal connection with the Missionary Union was eventually resumed. He had charge of two chapels in Ningbo, aided in his work by three native preachers.
Lord died in China on 17 September 1887.
