= Highland County Airport =

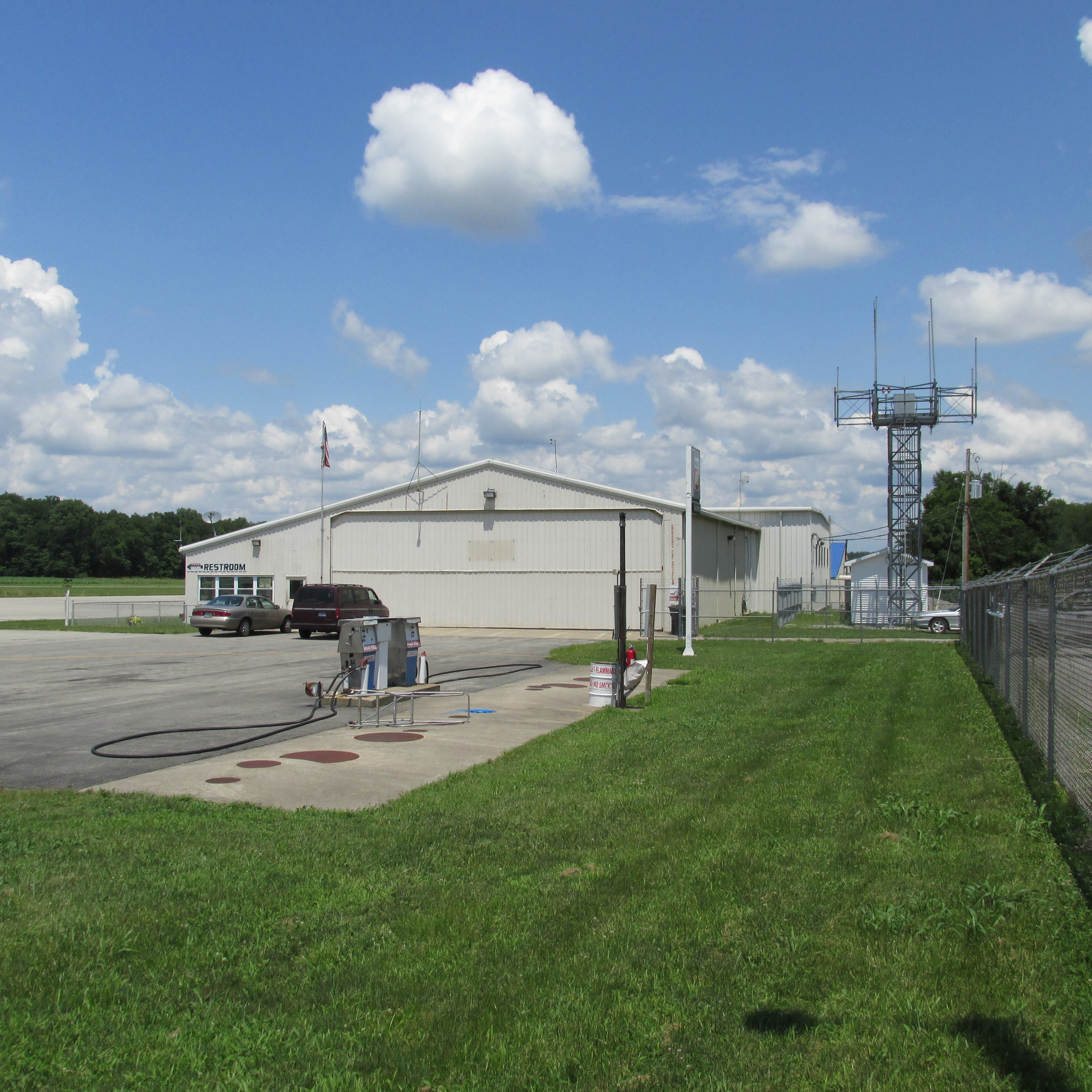
- Terminal building
- IATA: none; ICAO: KHOC; FAA LID: HOC

Summary
- Airport type: Public
- Owner: Highland County Commissioners
- Serves: Hillsboro, Ohio
- Elevation AMSL: 977 ft (298 m)
- Coordinates: 39°11′19″N 083°32′19″W

Map
- Location of airport in Ohio HOC (the United States)

Runways
Direction	Length		Surface
Direction	ft	m	Surface
05/23	3,520	1,073	Asphalt

Statistics (2021)
- Aircraft operations: 9,125
- Based aircraft: 16
- Source: Federal Aviation Administration

Highland County Airport (ICAO: KHOC, FAA LID: HOC) (Note: The airport formerly used the FAA location identifier I82.) is a public-owned, public-use airport located at 9500 North Shore Drive three nautical mile (4.8 km) southeast of the central business district of the city of Hillsboro, in Highland County, Ohio, United States.

Although many U.S. airports use the same three-letter location identifier for the FAA and IATA, this airport is assigned HOC by the FAA but has no designation from the IATA (which assigned HOC to Komako Airport in Komako, Papua New Guinea).

== History ==
Planning for an airport in Highland County began as early as September 1965, when members of a local airport commission attended a meeting in Columbus about an airport development program advocated by Governor Jim Rhodes. It was announced in October that the awarding of a $100,000 state grant was contingent on the passage of a two-mill levy to fund the airport. The county was seen to have an advantage over other entrants as it already had an option on 144 acres (58 ha) of land northeast of Rocky Fork Lake. However, the levy was voted down in November. As a result, a new site to the west of the lake near the county home was selected since the land was already government owned. It was announced in December 1966 that bidding for a new airport would begin the same month. Building supplies for a 4,480-square-foot (416 m^{2}) combination hangar and terminal building were delivered in September 1967. However, a week later, the paving contractor asked to be dropped from the project as delays caused by a strike of the site contractor's workers had increased the cost of construction to the point of unprofitability. Ground was broken on October 1st. The airport, along with a new road and facilities at Rocky Fork State Park, were dedicated on 22 September 1968. The county commissioners agreed to the construction of a partial perimeter fence in late May 1969 due to concerns that visitors to the park could be injured by aircraft. An additional $50,000 grant to add lighting to the airport was received in early September 1970.

An airport authority was established in mid September 1971. At the same time, the fixed-base operator ended its contract after it was unable to secure a lease for more than one year. By late May of the following year, the airport was being operated by Rollin and Marsha Tomlin. However, by 1975, it had run a deficit for five years. Fred Keyser became manager in October 1978. A non-profit called the Phoenix Flying Club took over operation of the airport in March 1979. Jerrie Mock, who had become airport manager at the same time, was succeeded by Jane Nye in mid 1979. They were, in turn, succeeded by Highland County Aviation in July 1984.

Following the paying off of the second of two sets of hangars in December 1984, the county commissioners claimed the airport authority was delinquent on paying hangar rental fees. The authority responded that after a loan from the county to build the hangars was repaid, it had assumed subsequent income generated by rentals could be used for airport improvements. It agreed to transfer the money, but requested proceeds be set aside for airport improvements, rather than being deposited in the county general fund. The commissioners granted the request, but also ended the annual financial support provided by the county. The expiry of liability coverage in March 1987 left the airport without insurance coverage. The airport received a state grant to extend two taxiways in July 1989. A group requested permission to build seven, and later an additional thirteen, 7,200-square-foot (670 m^{2}) hangars without county funds in June 1990.

An update to FAA rules necessitated the trimming back of additional nearby vegetation in 1996. Later that year, it received a bid to expand and refurbish a hangar. Construction was underway the following March.

Hangar 6, a fixed-base operator that had been located at Lunken Airport, broke ground at the airport in April 2001. At the same time, the airport received bids for the installation an AWOS.

In 2023, the owner of Hangar 6, a business at the airport, filed a lawsuit against the county commissioners and airport authority over taxes.

== Facilities and aircraft ==
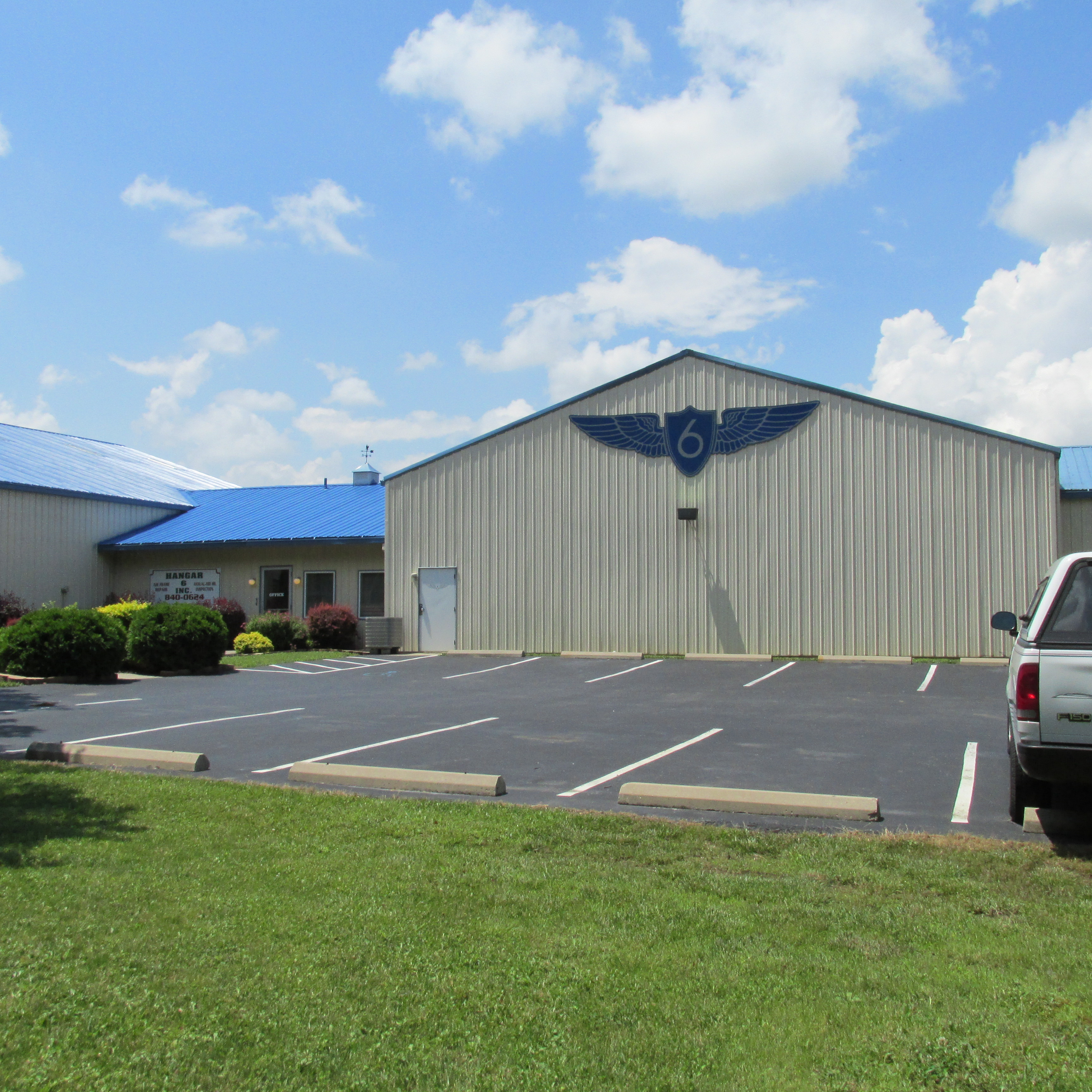
Hangar 6 Inc.

Highland County Airport covers an area of 15 acres (6.1 ha) at an elevation of 977 feet (298 m) above mean sea level. It has one asphalt paved runway: 05/23 is 3,520 by 75 feet (1,073 x 23 m).

For the 12-month period ending December 31, 2021, the airport had 9,125 aircraft operations, an average of 25 per day: 98% general aviation, 3% military, and <1% air taxi. At that time there were 16 aircraft based at this airport, all single-engine airplanes.

The airport has a fixed-base operator that sells avgas.

== Accidents and incidents ==
- On April 8, 1997, a Cessna 414 impacted trees and terrain while on approach to the Highland County Airport. The pilot, a professor at the University of Cincinnati, was taking one of his students for a ride to the Highland County Airport. Witnesses report the plane turned towards the airport but that it appeared the pilot was having difficulty stabilizing the aircraft, with another observing the plane in a 90-degree bank. The pilot appeared to be attempting to correct the situation but was ultimately unable. The probable cause of the accident was found to be the failure of the pilot to maintain adequate airspeed, while maneuvering, which resulted in an advertent stall and collision with trees, vehicles, and the terrain.
- On May 30, 2008, a Piper Cherokee crashed after departure from the Highland County airport. Witnesses report it struck several trees, caught fire, and crashed in a field. Witnesses say the airplane took off and maintained 300-400 feet before smoke began flowing from the right side of the aircraft. The aircraft then banked, descended, and struck the trees. The probable cause of the accident was found to be the pilot's failure to maintain control of the airplane due to an in-flight fire as a result of a corrosion hole in the muffler that was not identified by the mechanic. Contributing to the accident was the improper emergency procedure performed for an in-flight fire.
- On April 1, 2010, a single-engine Cessna 172 crashed at the airport while attempting to land. A witness reported observing the aircraft turning toward the airport at a low altitude. Another heard the sound of an airplane "throttling up" followed by the sound of a crash a few seconds later. The reason for the impact with the runway could not be determined, though the pilot's wife told authorities she feared her husband had been suicidal.
- On June 15, 2018, a Piper PA-22 crashed during landing at the Highland County Airport. During the landing roll, the aircraft exited the runway to the left, struck a runway light and impacted a ditch. The left main landing gear separated from the airplane and the airplane came to rest nose down. The pilot added that, while he was at the departure airport prior to the flight, jet blast blew him off a ladder during the preflight inspection, and the airplane's tail section was "picked up" and slammed onto the ground multiple times. He examined the airplane and did not find any anomalies. The probable cause of the accident was found to be the pilot’s failure to maintain directional control during landing.

== See also ==
- List of airports in Ohio
