= 1824 Ohio gubernatorial election =

- October 8, 1824
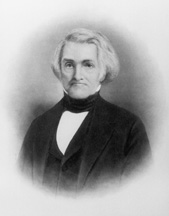

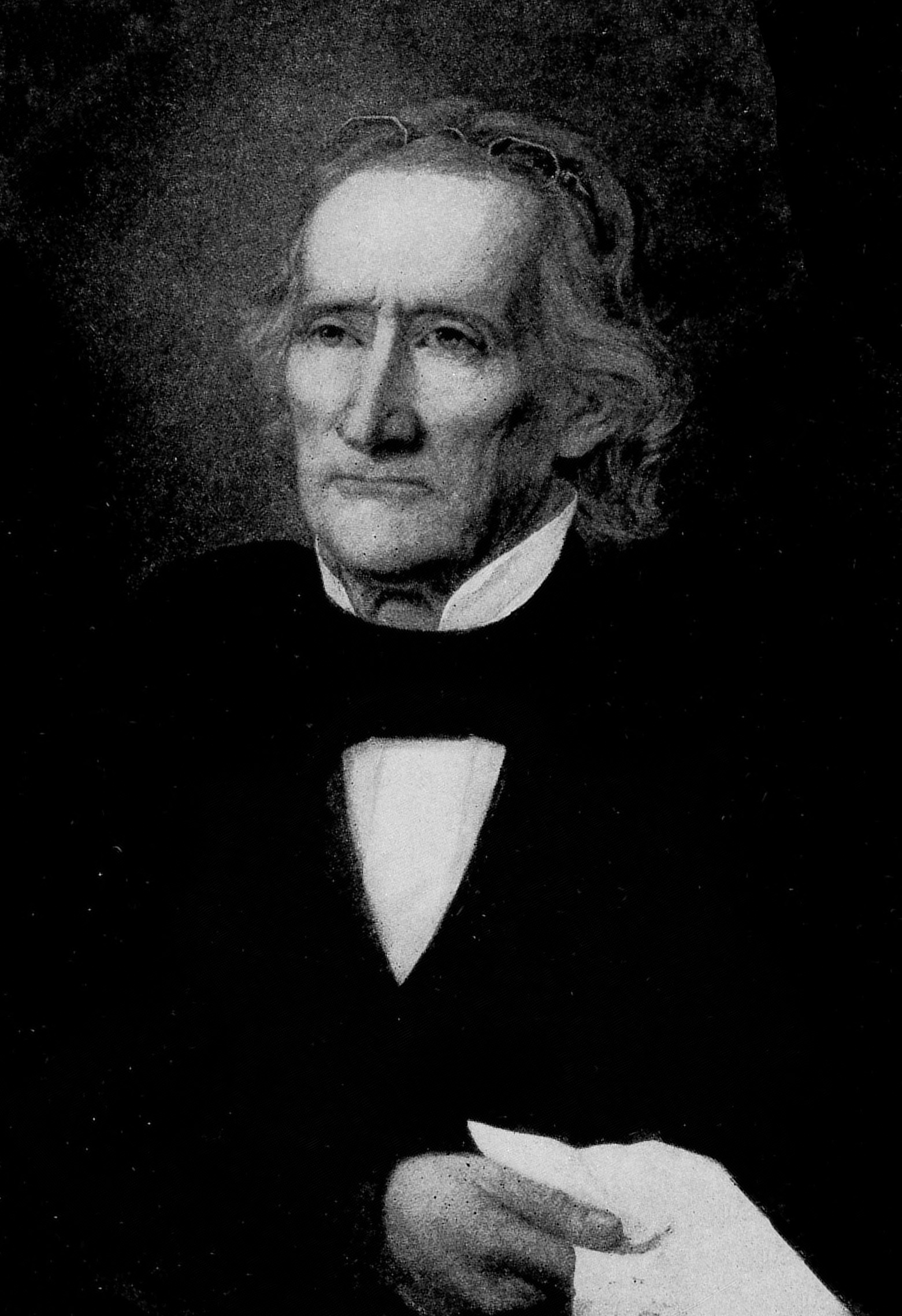
Nominee	Jeremiah Morrow	Allen Trimble
Party	Democratic-Republican	Democratic-Republican
Popular vote	39,526	37,108
Percentage	51.58%	48.42%
Election results by county
Morrow
50–60%
60–70%
70–80%
80–90%
90–100%
Trimble
50–60%
60–70%
70–80%
80–90%
90–100%
Unknown/no votes
Governor before election
Jeremiah Morrow
Democratic-Republican
Elected Governor
Jeremiah Morrow
Democratic-Republican

The 1824 Ohio gubernatorial election was held on October 12, 1824. The election was a rematch of 1822, with only the top two contenders returning. Incumbent Governor Morrow and Speaker of the Senate Trimble, who also served as acting Governor in 1822, both increased their vote share, lacking any other challengers. In this election, the two candidates agreed on the major issues, including support for a public school system and the development of internal improvements.

This was the last gubernatorial election that the Democratic-Republicans won in Ohio. About a month later, Henry Clay would win Ohio in the presidential election over Jackson and Adams, with both Morrow and Trimble joining his Whig Party.

== General election ==
=== Results ===
Ohio gubernatorial election, 1824
Party	Candidate	Votes	%	±%
Democratic-Republican	Jeremiah Morrow (incumbent)	39,526	51.58%	
Democratic-Republican	Allen Trimble	37,108	48.42%	
Majority		2,418	3.16%	
Turnout		76,634		
Democratic-Republican hold		Swing		
