= 1855 Ohio gubernatorial election =

- October 9, 1855
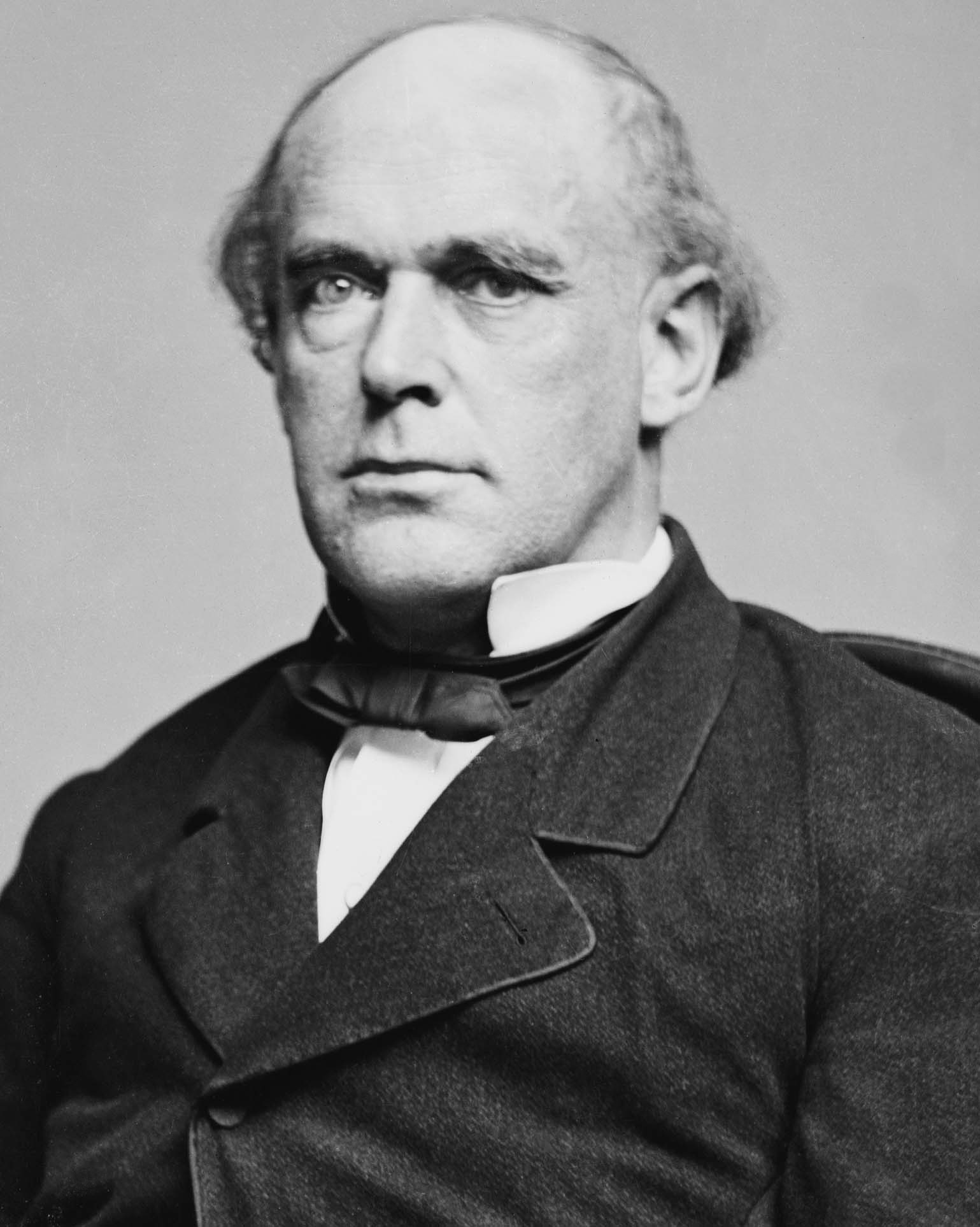

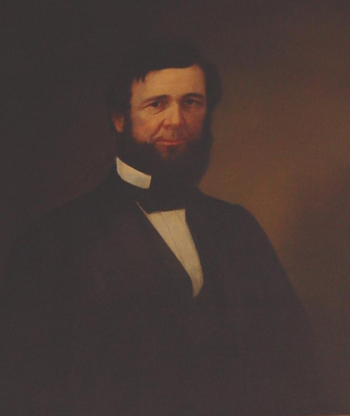

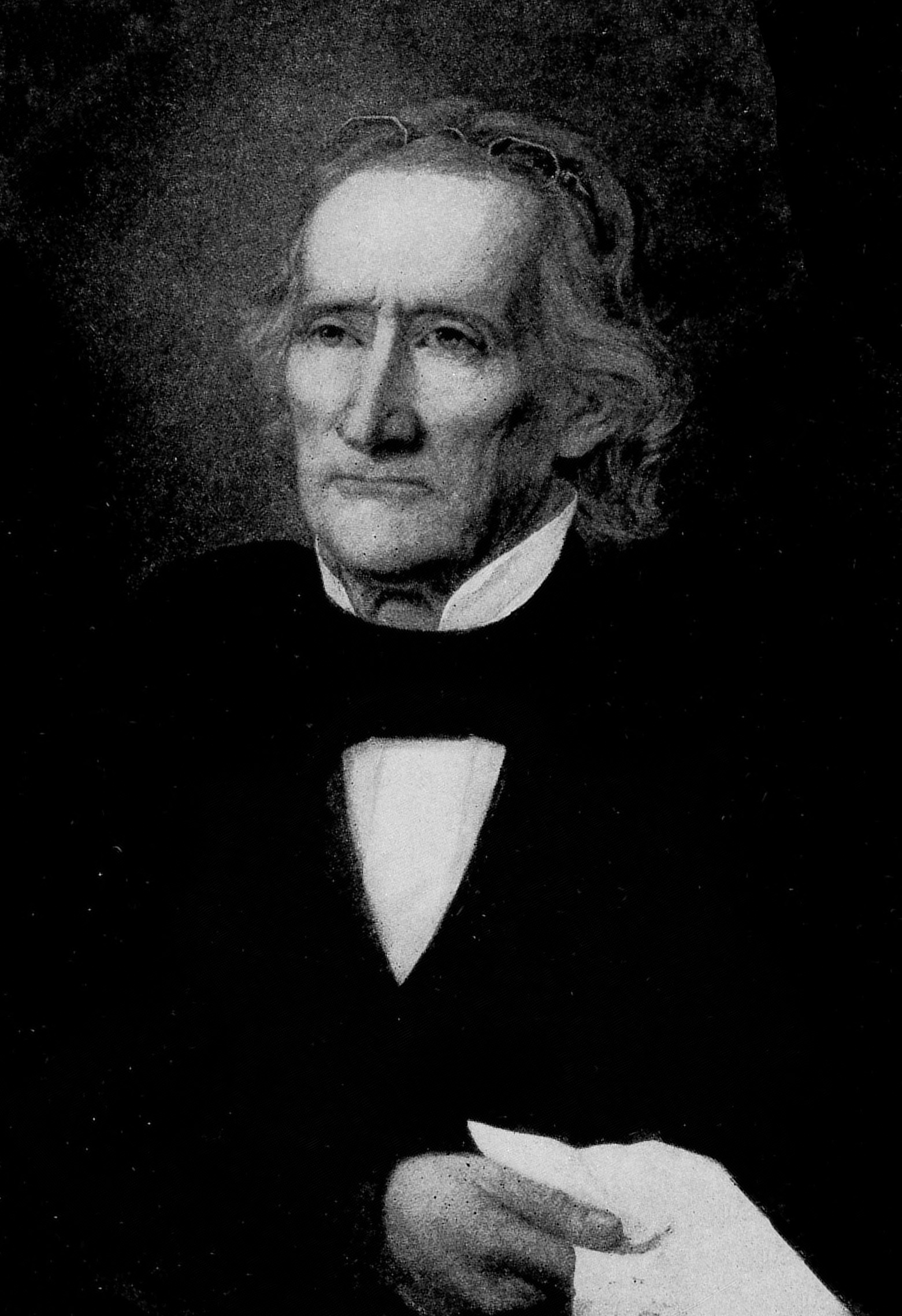
Nominee	Salmon Chase	William Medill	Allen Trimble
Party	Republican	Democratic	Know Nothing
Popular vote	146,770	131,019	24,276
Percentage	48.59%	43.37%	8.04%
County Results
Chase
40–50%
50–60%
60–70%
70–80%
Medill
30–40%
40–50%
50–60%
60–70%
Trimble
30–40%
40–50%
Governor before election
William Medill
Democratic
Elected Governor
Salmon Chase
Republican

The 1855 Ohio gubernatorial election was held on October 9, 1855. Incumbent Democratic Governor of Ohio William Medill became governor after the resignation of Reuben Wood to accept a consulship, and was elected in his own right in 1853. The 1855 election was one of the first major tests of the fledgling Republican Party, then still a coalition of various anti-slavery forces, including former rival Democrats and Whig members. This election led them to quickly dominate Ohio politics for the next half-century.

The election is also unique in that it was a contest of three Governors, past, present, and future. With Allen Trimble having served in the 1820s, William Medill serving at the time of the election, and Salmon Chase succeeding Medill. Trimble proved to be somewhat of a spoiler candidate, leaving Chase to win with only a plurality of the votes.

== Republican convention ==
=== Candidates ===
- Salmon Chase, U.S. Senator and former Cincinnati City Councilman
- Joseph R. Swan, Associate Justice of the Ohio Supreme Court
- Hiram Griswold, future defense attorney for John Brown

=== Results ===
1855 Republican convention
Party	Candidate	Votes	%
Republican	Salmon Chase	225	60.98%
Republican	Joseph R. Swan	102	27.64%
Republican	Hiram Griswold	42	11.38%
Total votes		369	100.00%

== General election ==
=== Results ===
Ohio gubernatorial election, 1855
Party	Candidate	Votes	%	±%
Republican	Salmon Chase	146,770	48.59%	
Democratic	William Medill (incumbent)	131,019	43.37%	
Know Nothing	Allen Trimble	24,276	8.04%	
Majority		15,751	5.21%	
Turnout		302,065		
Republican gain from Democratic		Swing		
