= Washingtonian movement =

19th-century temperance movement in the United States

The Washingtonian movement (Washingtonians, Washingtonian Temperance Society or Washingtonian Total Abstinence Society) was a 19th-century temperance fellowship founded on Thursday, April 2, 1840, by six alcoholics (William K. Mitchell, John F. Hoss, David Anderson, George Steers, James McCurley, and Archibald Campbell) at Chase's Tavern on Liberty Street in Baltimore, Maryland.

The idea was that by relying on each other, sharing their alcoholic experiences, and creating an atmosphere of conviviality, they could keep each other sober. Total abstinence from alcohol (teetotalism) was their goal. The group taught sobriety and preceded Alcoholics Anonymous by almost a century. Members sought out other "drunkards" (the term alcoholic had not yet been created), told them their experiences with excessive alcohol use, and how the Society had helped them achieve sobriety. With the passage of time the Society became a prohibitionist organization in that it promoted the legal and mandatory prohibition of alcoholic beverages. The Society was the inspiration for Timothy Shay Arthur's Six Nights with the Washingtonians and his Ten Nights in a Bar-Room.

The Washingtonians differed from other organizations in the temperance movement in that they focused on the individual alcoholic rather than on society's greater relationship with liquor. In the mid-19th century, a temperance movement was in full sway across the United States and temperance workers advanced their anti-alcohol views on every front. Public temperance meetings were frequent and the main thread was prohibition of alcohol and pledges of sobriety to be made by the individual.

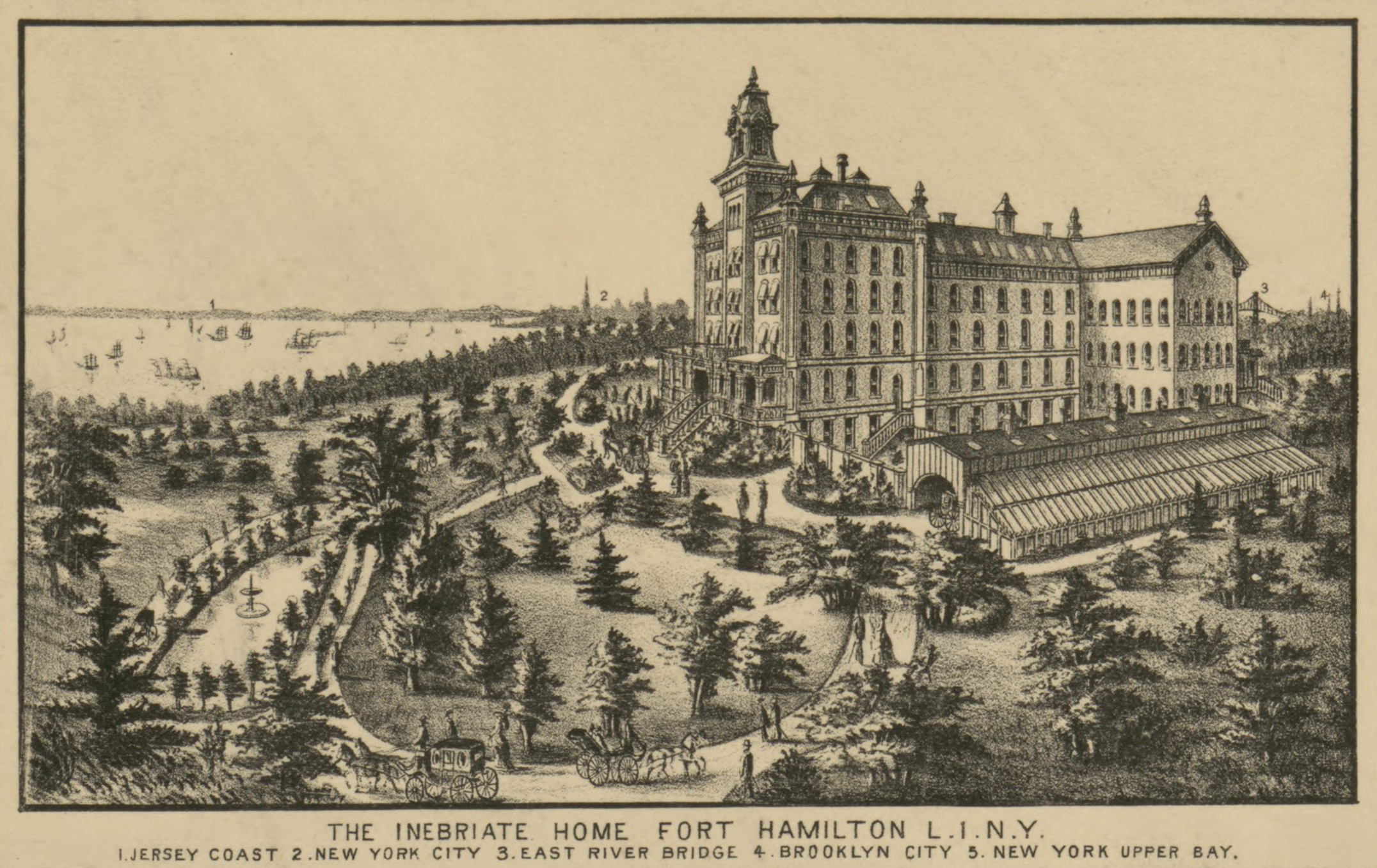
The Inebriate Home of Long Island, detail from the Taylor Map of New York (1879)

Concurrent with this movement, a loose network of facilities both public and private offered treatment to drunkards. Referred to as inebriate asylums and reformatory homes, they included the New York State Inebriate Asylum, The Inebriate Home of Long Island, N.Y., the Home for Incurables in San Francisco, the Franklin Reformatory Home in Philadelphia and the Washingtonian Homes which opened in Boston and Chicago in 1857.

Washingtonians at their peak numbered in the tens of thousands, possibly as high as 600,000. However, in the space of just a few years, this society almost disappeared because they became fragmented in their primary purpose, becoming involved with all manner of controversial social reforms including prohibition, sectarian religion, politics and abolition of slavery. It is believed that Abraham Lincoln attended and spoke at one of the great revivals, presumably not for treatment, but out of interest in various issues being discussed. As the Washingtonians drifted away from their initial purpose of helping individuals with alcohol dependence, internal disagreements, factionalism, and involvement in broader social issues such as Prohibition in the United States contributed to the organization's decline. By the time William Griffith Wilson ("Bill") and Bob Smith ("Dr. Bob") co-founded Alcoholics Anonymous in 1935, the Washingtonian movement had largely been forgotten, and neither founder was aware of its history.

Although comparisons are made between the Washingtonians and Alcoholics Anonymous, they also have much in common with modern secular drug addiction recovery groups. The Washingtonians were accused by contemporary religious critics of humanism heresy, or "placing their own power above the power of God."

== Notable people ==
- Esther Lord McNeill (1812–1907), temperance leader

== See also ==
- Temperance organizations
- Martha Washingtonians

== Sources ==
- Blocker, Jack S. et al. (Eds.), Alcohol and Temperance in Modern History, vol. 2, Santa Barbara: ABC-Clio 2003.
- Blumberg, Leonard U. The significance of the alcohol prohibitionists for the Washingtonian Temperance Society. The Journal of Studies on Alcohol, 1980, 41(L).
- Koch, Donald A. A Dictionary of Literary Biographers; Antebellum Writers in New York and the South. Vol 3. Myers, Joe (Ed.) : Detroit: Bruccoli, 1979, 3-7.
- Leonard U. Blumberg & William L. Pittman, Beware the First Drink! The Washingtonian Temperance Movement and Alcoholics Anonymous, Seattle: Glen Abbey Books, 1991, ISBN 0-934125-22-8.
