= Allen Trimble =

American politician (1783–1870)

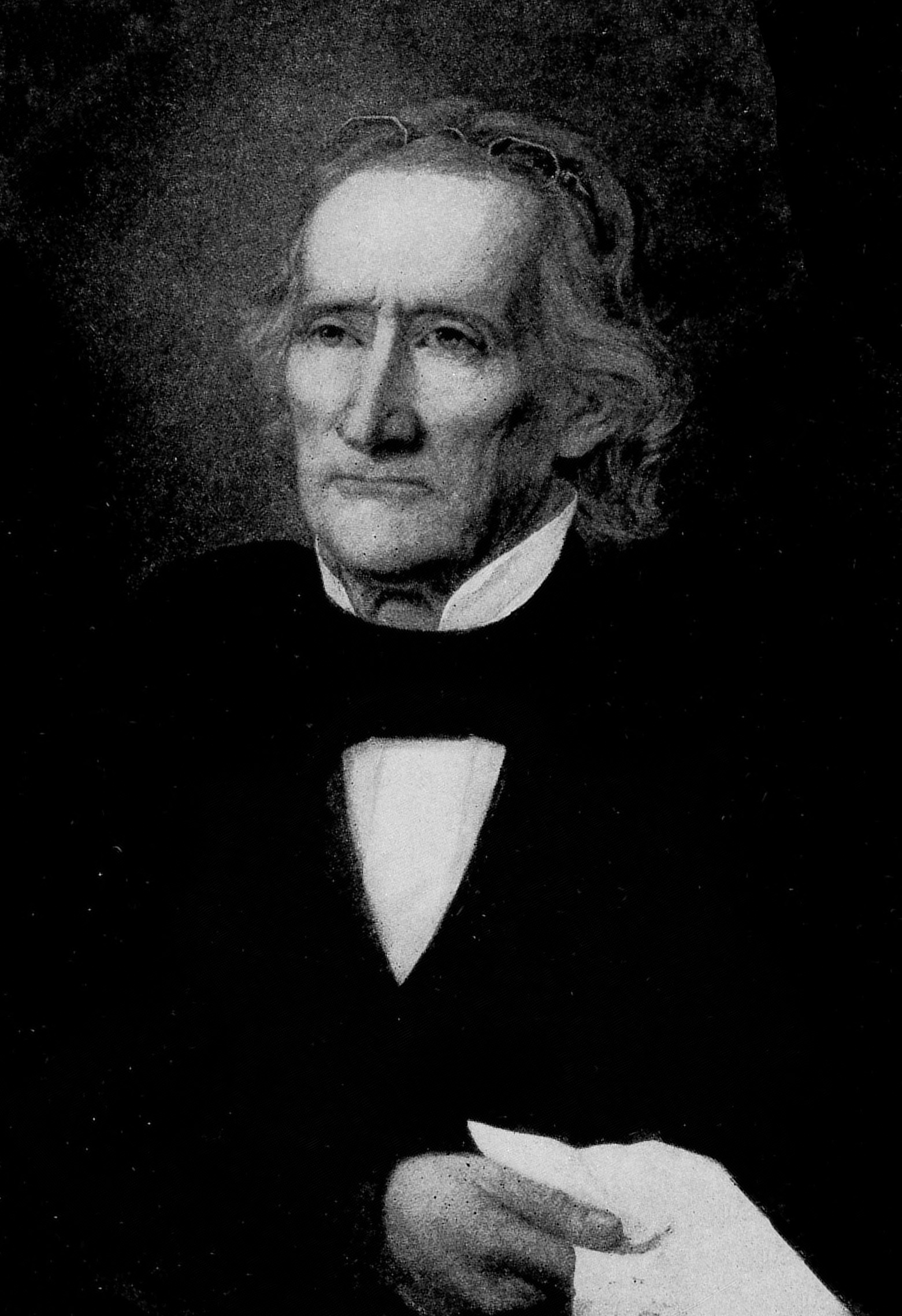

8th & 10th Governor of Ohio
- In office December 19, 1826 – December 18, 1830
- Preceded by: Jeremiah Morrow
- Succeeded by: Duncan McArthur
- In office January 4, 1822 – December 28, 1822
- Preceded by: Ethan Allen Brown
- Succeeded by: Jeremiah Morrow

12th Speaker of the Ohio Senate
- In office December 6, 1819 – December 3, 1826
- Preceded by: Robert Lucas
- Succeeded by: Abraham Shepherd

Member of the Ohio Senate from Highland and Fayette counties
- In office 1817–1826
- Preceded by: Samuel Evans
- Succeeded by: John Jones

Member of the Ohio House of Representatives from Highland County
- In office 1816–1817
- Preceded by: James Johnston
- Succeeded by: Joseph Swearingen

Personal details
- Born: November 24, 1783 Augusta County, Virginia
- Died: February 3, 1870 (aged 86) Hillsboro, Ohio, U.S.
- Party: Democratic-Republican; National Republican; Whig; Know Nothing; Constitutional Union
- Relations: James Trimble (father); Jane Allen Trimble (mother)
- Children: Eliza Thompson (daughter)

Allen Trimble (November 24, 1783 – February 3, 1870) was a Federalist and National Republican politician from Ohio. He served as the eighth and tenth governor of Ohio, first concurrently as Senate Speaker, later elected twice in his own right.

== Biography ==
Governor Trimble was born Hugh Allen Trimble in Augusta County, Virginia to James Trimble, Revolutionary War veteran, and Jane Allen Trimble. He was of Ulster Scots ancestry. In October 1784, his father moved his family to a veterans land grant in then Fayette County, Kentucky. In October 1804, James Trimble died leaving Allen head of the family. Allen Trimble moved them to a homestead he and his father had established outside of Hillsboro, Ohio.

== Career ==
Trimble was a clerk of the Common Pleas Court in 1808. He also served as recorder of deeds in 1808.

After briefly serving during the War of 1812, Trimble served in the Ohio House of Representatives from 1816 to 1817 and then in the Ohio State Senate from 1818 to 1826. Trimble became Speaker of the Senate, and it was in this capacity that he became governor from January to December 1822 when Governor Ethan Allen Brown resigned to take a seat in the United States Senate.

Trimble ran an election for a full term in 1822, but narrowly lost. He challenged Jeremiah Morrow again in 1824, narrowing the distance between the two, but still losing. He won a landslide election in 1826, however, as a National Republican and then won a second full term in 1828. Trimble did not seek re-election in 1830.

He then retired to farming, taking little part in politics for the next quarter-century, but did consent to accepting the nomination of the Know-Nothings for governor in 1855. Trimble came in third, losing to Republican US Senator Salmon Chase and incumbent Democrat William Medill. In 1860 he was a delegate to the Constitutional Union Party convention in Baltimore.

== Death ==
Trimble died at his family farm in Ohio, and was buried in Hillsboro Cemetery in Hillsboro, Ohio.

== Legacy ==
Trimble, Ohio, a village in Athens County, Ohio, is named in Trimble's honor. Court Street, a street in Hillsboro, Ohio, on the north side of the Highland County Courthouse, was renamed "Governor Trimble Place" in 1974.

Trimble's daughter, Eliza, helped to initiate the temperance movement in the United States.

Trimble is an ancestor of astronomer Virginia Louise Trimble.

Party political offices
First	National Republican nominee for Governor of Ohio; 1826, 1828	Succeeded by Duncan McArthur
First	Know Nothing nominee for Governor of Ohio; 1855	Succeeded by Philadelph Van Trump
Political offices
Preceded by Robert Lucas	Speaker of the Ohio Senate; 1819–1826	Succeeded by Abraham Shepherd
Preceded by Ethan Allen Brown	Governor of Ohio; 1822	Succeeded by Jeremiah Morrow
Preceded by Jeremiah Morrow	Governor of Ohio; 1826–1830	Succeeded by Duncan McArthur
Ohio House of Representatives
Preceded by James Johnston	Representative from Highland County; 1816–1817	Succeeded by Joseph Swearingen
Ohio Senate
Preceded by Samuel Evans	Senator from Highland and Fayette Counties; 1817–1826	Succeeded by John Jones
