= Esther Lord McNeill =

American temperance leader (1812–1907)

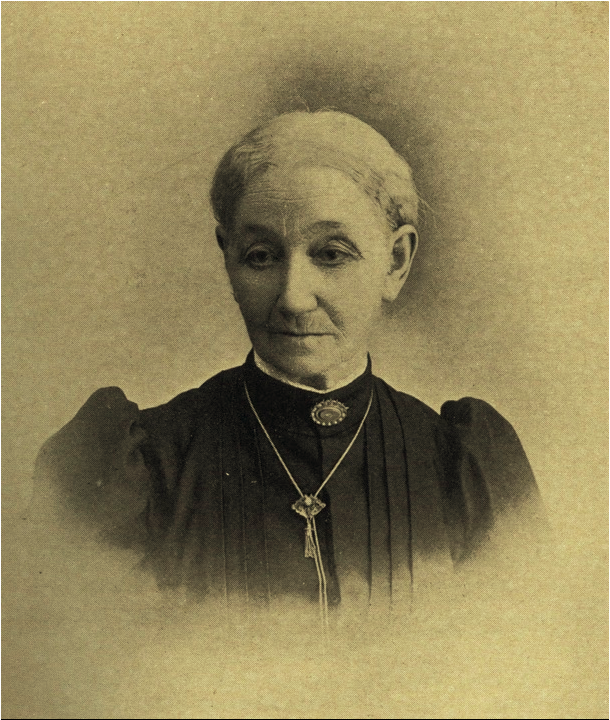
- Born: Esther Lord; July 23, 1812; Carlisle, New York, U.S.
- Died: April 20, 1907 (aged 94); Fredonia, New York, U.S.
- Other name: "Mother McNeill"
- Occupations: temperance movement leader; foster parent; travel writer
- Known for: Women's Crusade
- Notable work: Co-founder, Woman's Christian Temperance Union
- Spouse: James McNeill (m. 1832; died 1870)
- Relatives: Edward Clemens Lord (brother)

Esther Lord McNeill (also known as "Mother McNeill"; 1812–1907) was a leader in the temperance movement of the United States, associated with the Washingtonian movement, Women's Crusade, and the Woman's Christian Temperance Union (WCTU). She was one of the band of crusaders whose work in Fredonia, New York, in 1873 was the foundation of the WCTU. McNeill was also a foster parent and travel writer.

== Early life ==
Esther Lord was born at Carlisle, New York, July 23, 1812. Her father, Sylavanus Lord (1762-1822), was a Connecticut Yankee, her mother, Elizabeth Blanchard (1775-1858), a native of Massachusetts. When Esther was ten years of age, her father died, leaving ten children.

== Career ==
In 1832, she married James McNeill, a wainwright, and together they enlisted in the Washingtonian movement. About a month after her marriage, she became a Christian, a devout Presbyterian, and began a life's work of caring for homeless children. In 1868, the couple moved to Fredonia, Chautauqua County, New York. Her brother, Edward Clemens Lord, was a Baptist missionary in China, unable to care for his five children, and Mrs. McNeills agreed to do so. In addition, they came with eight or ten foster children to be put to school. Two years later, Mr. McNeill, a member of the State Temperance Society, died, and in this same year, one of the girls that Mrs. McNeill cared for also died.

In 1873, she entered the list of Women Crusaders, and became a member of the WCTU, organized December 22, 1873, in Fredonia. This union continued to be the leading union in Chautauqua County, holding weekly meetings, and loyal always to county, state, and national organizations. Mrs. McNeil was the first Chautauqua County president, and until 1894, the WCTU president in Fredonia. Thereafter, until her death, she was its honorary president.

McNeill was a delegate to the first New York State WCTU, in Syracuse, New York, on October 14, 1874, when the New York State organization was formed, preceding by a month the convention held in Cleveland at the Second Presbyterian Church, November 18–20. She attended all the national conventions up to 1905, when compelled by failing strength, she retired from active service. By her fellow workers and intimates she was affectionately called "Mother McNeill".

== Later life ==
Sometime after 1882, McNeill travelled to Japan and China and sent letters the U.S. that were published in The Fredonia Censor.

McNeill's health had been failing because of advanced age for some time, but she was clear-thinking until a few days before her death, when she became semi-unconscious. She died April 20, 1907, at Fredonia.
