= WLRU-LP =

- Hillsboro, Ohio; United States
- Broadcast area: Highland County
- Frequency: 106.9 MHz
- Branding: 106.9 WLRU

Programming
- Format: Christian radio (Catholic)
- Affiliations: CatholicTV

Ownership
- Owner: St. Mary Catholic Broadcasting System

History
- First air date: December 23, 2014
- Call sign meaning: "Where the Lord is Right for You"

Technical information
- Licensing authority: FCC
- Facility ID: 194828
- Class: LP1 (Low-power FM)
- ERP: 100 watts
- HAAT: 26.6 meters (87 ft)
- Transmitter coordinates: 39°11′25″N 83°36′38″W

Links
- Public license information: LMS
- Webcast: Listen live
- Website: www.saintmaryhillsboro.org

WLRU-LP (106.9 FM) is a non-commercial low-power FM broadcasting station in Hillsboro, Ohio airing Catholic programming. Local Masses, recitation of the Holy Rosary and related programming is broadcast live from St. Mary Catholic Church in Hillsboro in addition to polka music and network programming (in audio portion) provided by CatholicTV Network.

Father Mike Paraniuk is the founder and program director and is the host of the weekly polka program. Fr. Paraniuk is of Polish descent and heritage and has previously did on-air work at WOBO-FM in Batavia from 1982 until 2005.

LaRue Turner, previously an engineer and co-owner at the former WELX in Xenia (now WGNZ in Fairborn) is the consulting engineer who was at first the inspiration for the callsign.

According to a Highland County Press newspaper article dated December 18,2014 WLRU was scheduled to come on the air on December 23, 2014 beginning with the initial airing of Christmas music. The new LPFM followed through on its promise on that date.

The station was profiled in the March 2015 edition of The Catholic Telegraph, the official newspaper of the Cincinnati Archdiocese.
