= Matilda Gilruth Carpenter =

American activist

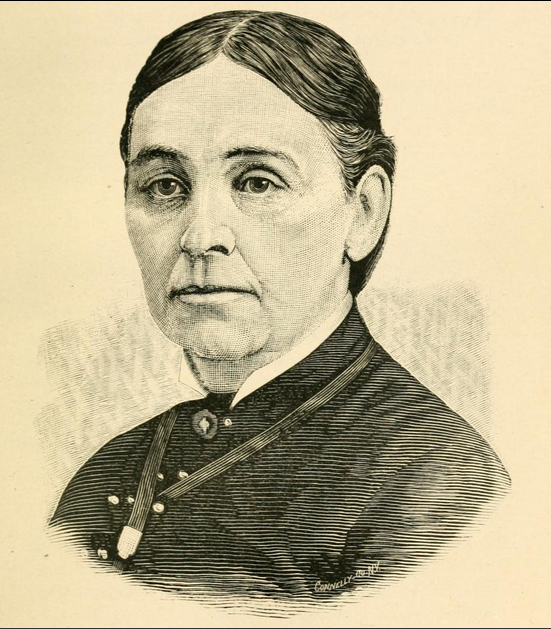
- Born: Matilda Gilruth; August 12, 1831
- Died: March 1, 1923 (aged 91)
- Other names: Mrs. George Carpenter

Matilda Gilruth Carpenter (1831–1923) was a prominent member of the Woman's Christian Temperance Union, known for leading the crusade against alcohol sales in Ohio in 1874.

Carpenter is best remembered as the leader of the Woman's Crusade at Washington Court House, Ohio, during which women prayed in local bars saloons in protest against alcohol use. The crusade began in 1870, and Carpenter provided guidance to towns interested in the movement. On Christmas Day in 1874 Carpenter led the women into saloons and collected pledges from businesses that they would stop the sale of liquor.

1n 1893, she published The Crusade: Its Origin and Development at Washington Court House and Its Results, a detailed account of the movement, which was praised by Marshall Jay Williams of the Ohio Supreme Court and others. Carpenter was also an associate and correspondent of Annie Turner Wittenmyer.

In 1920 prohibition in the United States was enacted, by which time Carpenter was 88 years old and she enthusiastically shared her remembrances of the crusade that she led in 1873.

== Personal life ==
Carpenter's father, James Gilruth, was the pastor of the Methodist Church in Worthington, Ohio and her mother, Mary (Westlake) Gilruth, was described as "a woman of great intellectual vigor". In 1852, Carpenter married George Carpenter, a Presbyterian minister, and her husband actively supported her position on temperance. Her son, Willard Bryant Carpenter practiced homeopathy and was a member of the Sons of the American Revolution.
