= Women's Crusade =

American temperance campaign

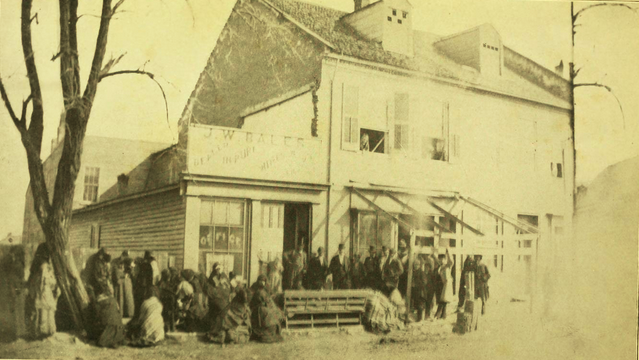
Crusaders of Hillsboro, Ohio, December 1873

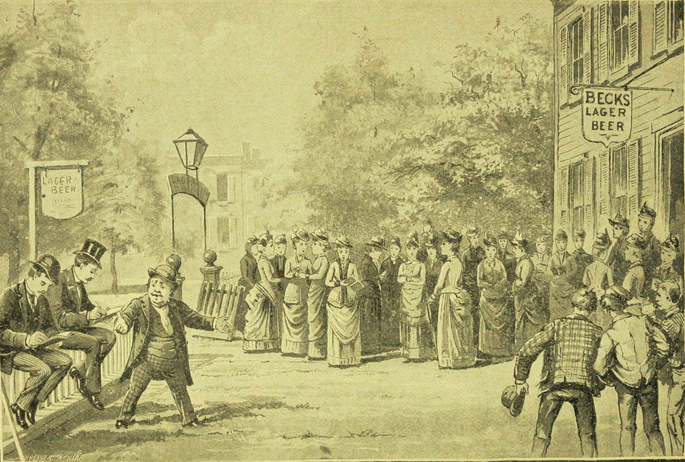
Scene at Beck's Saloon, Washington Court House, Ohio

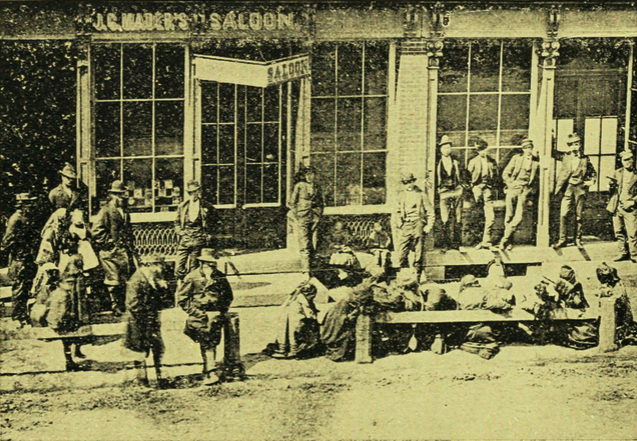
Prayer scene in Bucyrus, Ohio

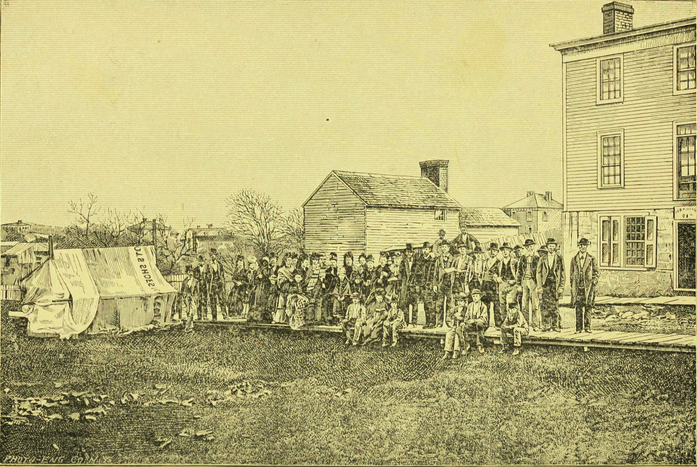
Scene in Greenville, Tennessee

The Woman's Crusade was a temperance campaign in the United States in 1873-1874, preceding the formation of the Woman's Christian Temperance Union (WCTU) in November 1874. It was a series of non-violent protests fighting against the dangers of alcohol.

== Background ==
Many women in Cleveland, Ohio were inspired by a speech given by Diocletian Lewis to fight against the vices of alcohol. Contemporary literature depicted alcohol abuse among men as a driver of domestic abusive, profligacy, and neglect of their duties to their families. The goal of the crusade was to close as many saloons as possible using methods of prayer, song, and exhortation as customers walked in and out of the saloons.The women faced pushback by business owners who turned the tables on them by singing outside of the crusaders' homes and paying other women to mock them. Ohio was the central location of the crusade, with over one-third of the events taking place there, but the crusade spread to over 900 different communities in over 31 states in the United States.

== History ==
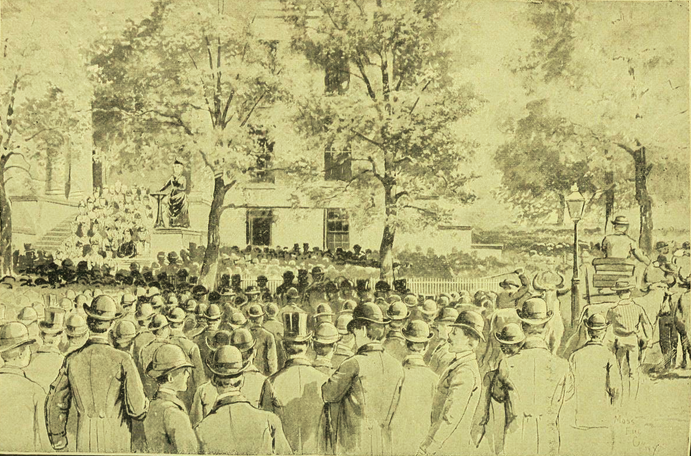
Mother Stewart speaking from courthouse steps, London, Ohio

The main temperance reformer of the movement was Eliza Daniel Stewart, referred to as "Mother Stewart". She was a key figure in the crusade. Another figure of the crusade was Eliza Jane Thompson, who pushed the crusade by going to saloons and praying and asking the owners to pledge to stop selling alcohol. They asked saloonkeepers to get rid of all their alcohol and to enter a new business.

The Women's Crusade gave women the opportunity to get involved in the public sphere. In the crusade, women used religious methods because they had the most experience in that area. The movement left a lasting impact on woman's involvement in social history and led to the creation of the Woman's Christian Temperance Union. Although many people were hesitant about allowing women to be involved in the Temperance Movement, women had many breakthroughs throughout the movement which led to the closure of many saloons across the United States. The movement gave women the opportunity to advocate for their rights while they fought for temperance with their growing voice in the public sphere.

== The Crusade in Xenia, Ohio ==
In Xenia, Ohio, there were over a hundred saloons. People gathered around these saloons and started throwing all types of alcohol into the street saluting to God to give up alcohol. A major event of the crusade was when Steve Phillips, owner of the Shades of Death (a saloon), surrendered his saloon to the movement. The closure of the Shades of Death was considered the major component of the crusade in Ohio and helped shape the Temperance movement by leading to the closure of many more saloons.

== The Crusade in South Charleston, Ohio ==
Women marched throughout the street in the cold winter checking to make sure that no sales were made in the saloons. They had routines of prayers and business meetings throughout their long days on the move. The women formed distinct lines, marching on the streets to perform hymns outside of the saloons. Many of the marchers also prepared pledges for the saloonkeepers.

== The Crusade in Berea, Ohio ==
Women organized into a women's league and they wrote their own constitution concerning their views on alcohol. One prominent stop in their march was the saloon of Thomas Chope. They were able to get into his saloon and conducted a prayer in the middle of his saloon. These prayers became known as "pray-ins". One challenge that the women faced was the refusal of some saloonkeepers to open their saloons to them. In one case, saloonkeeper Martin Cummins locked his saloon's doors, so the women were unable to enter. In cases like this, the women prayed outside the saloons to send their message about alcohol.

== Notable people ==
A few of the people in Ohio and other states who were part of the Crusade:

- Ohio: Eliza J. Thompson, Matilda Gilruth Carpenter, Eliza Daniel Stewart ('Mother' Stewart), Harriet Calista Clark McCabe, Mary Bigelow Ingham, Martha McClellan Brown, and Abby Fisher Leavitt
- Other states:

- California: Dorcas James Spencer and Miss Emma Janes
- Illinois: Jennie Fowler Willing, Elizabeth Eunice Smith Marcy, and Emily Huntington Miller
- Massachusetts: Mary Livermore and Mrs. Susan A. Gifford
- New Hampshire: Mrs. Hutchins Hills, Mrs. Fenner and Mrs. O. H. Wendell
- New York: Esther Lord McNeill, Mary Coffin Johnson, and Margaret E. Winslow:* Pennsylvania: Annie Turner Wittenmyer and Mrs. Dr. O. B. Gause
