= 1822 Ohio gubernatorial election =

- October 8, 1822
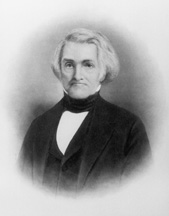

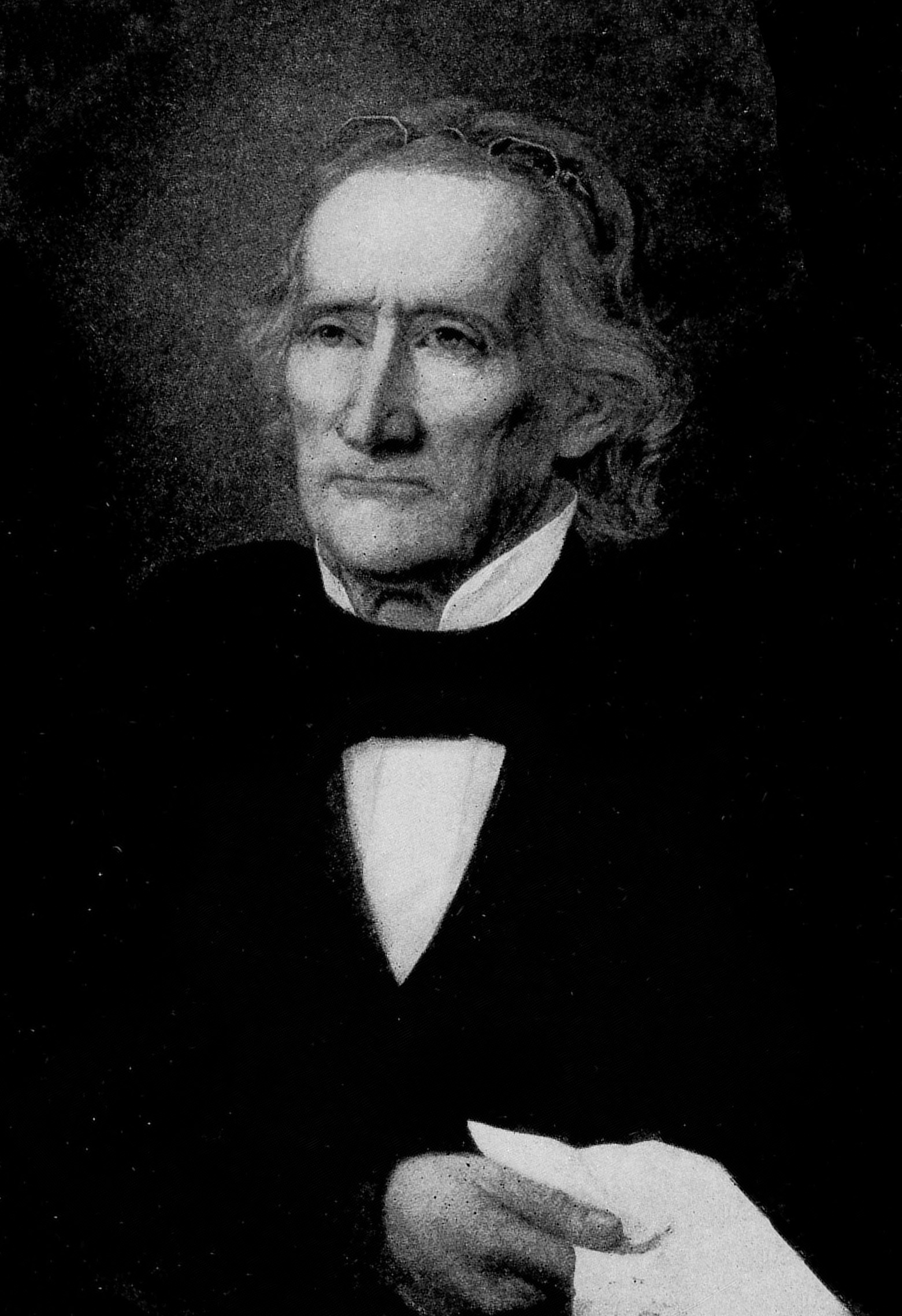

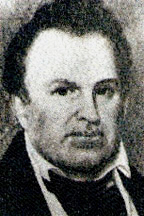
Nominee	Jeremiah Morrow	Allen Trimble	William W. Irvin
Party	Democratic-Republican	Democratic-Republican	Democratic-Republican
Popular vote	26,059	22,899	11,050
Percentage	41.06%	36.08%	17.41%
- Election results by county Morrow: 50–60% 60–70% 70–80% 80–90% 90–100% Trimble: 30–40% 40–50% 50–60% 60–70% 80–90% 90–100% Irvin: 40–50% 60–70% 70–80% 80–90% 90–100% Unknown/no votes
Governor before election
Allen Trimble
Democratic-Republican
Elected Governor
Jeremiah Morrow
Democratic-Republican

The 1822 Ohio gubernatorial election was held on October 8, 1822. Speaker of the Senate Allen Trimble had acted as governor since the resignation of Ethan Allen Brown to accept a Senate seat. Former senator, and 1820 gubernatorial challenger Jeremiah Morrow narrowly beat Trimble and former Ohio Supreme Court justice William Irvin.

== General election ==
=== Results ===
Ohio gubernatorial election, 1822
Party	Candidate	Votes	%	±%
Democratic-Republican	Jeremiah Morrow	26,059	41.06%	
Democratic-Republican	Allen Trimble (incumbent)	22,899	36.08%	
Democratic-Republican	William W. Irvin	11,050	17.41%	
Other	Others	3,462	5.46%	
Majority		3,160	4.98%	
Turnout		63,470		
Democratic-Republican hold		Swing		
