= Martha Washingtonians =

19th-century American addiction organization

The Martha Washingtonians (also known as the Ladies Washingtonian Society) were a group of working class women of the early 19th century committed to the idea of encouraging temperance. The organization was an outgrowth of the Washingtonian temperance movement. As an organization, it was composed of wives, sisters, aunts, daughters and other female relatives of drunken men.

These women saw their public work as extensions of a 19th-century ideology that insisted on the ability of women to preserve the moral integrity of the private household. Historians such as Teresa Murphy insist on their relative subordination in the temperance movement. Murphy notes that many of these Martha Washingtonians were assigned rather traditional female roles: for example, collecting, making and selling clothing to the families of reformed drunks.

Women's rights were not prevalent nor wanted by most of these women – the movement was broadly conservative in outlook. They had no desire to vote, or to change America in any way besides alcohol consumption.

== See also ==
- Prohibition

== Sources ==
- "We Are Engaged as a Band of Sisters": Class and Domesticity in the Washingtonian Temperance Movement, 1840-1850 Ruth M. Alexander Journal of American History, Vol. 75, No. 3 (Dec., 1988), pp. 763–785 doi:10.2307/1901529
- http://silkworth.net/washingtonians/washingtonian_movement_spread_movement.html The Washingtonian Movement : The Spread of The Movement
