= Hillsboro, Ohio =

- City
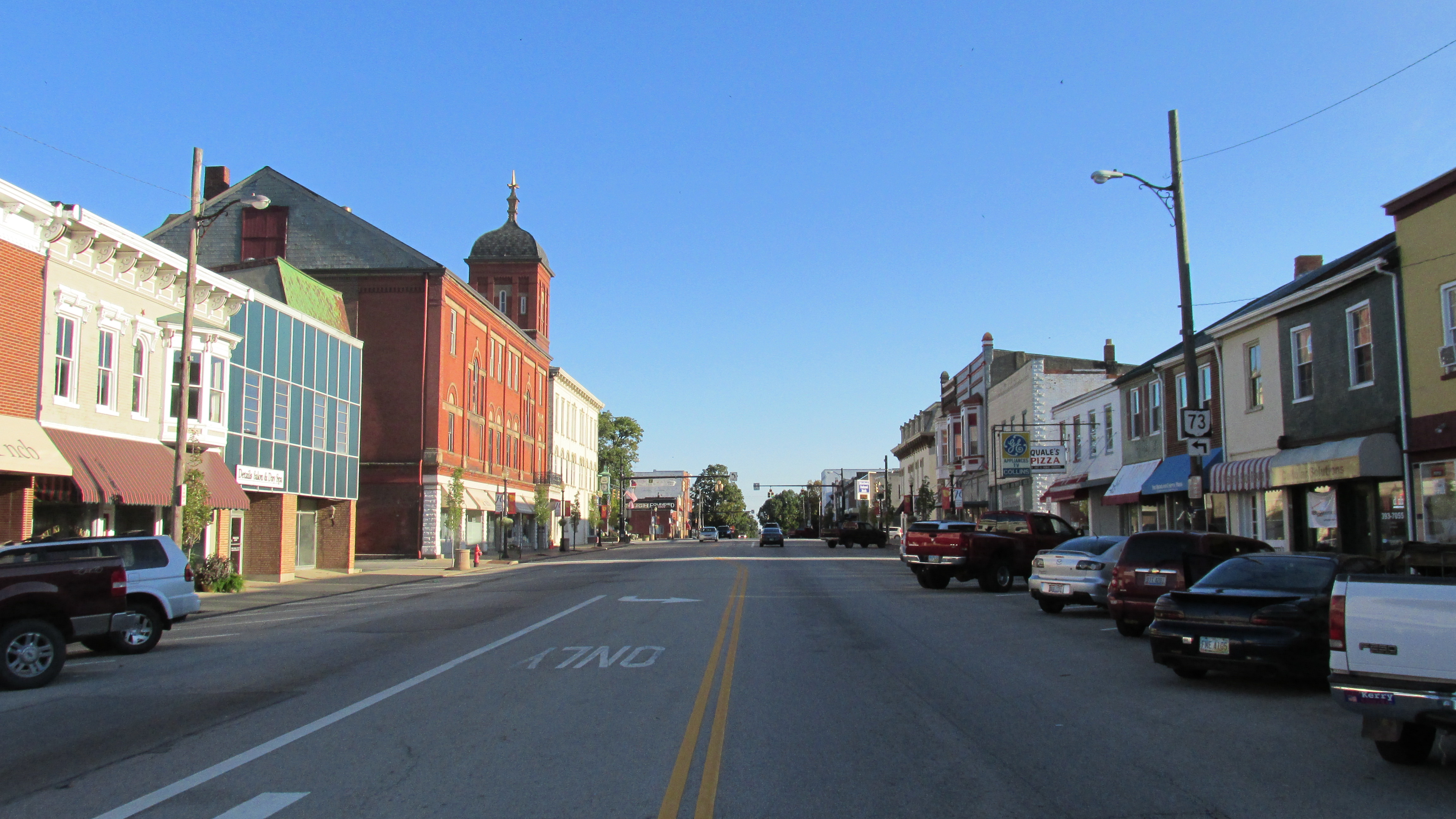
- High Street; the tall structure is the Bell Opera House
- Motto: "Where Pride Rings True..."
- Interactive map of Hillsboro, Ohio
- Location within Ohio Location within the United States
- Coordinates: 39°12′28″N 83°37′10″W
- Country: United States
- State: Ohio
- County: Highland

Government
  - Mayor: Justin Harsha

Area
  - Total: 5.47 sq mi (14.18 km^{2})
  - Land: 5.47 sq mi (14.18 km^{2})
  - Water: 0 sq mi (0.00 km^{2}) 0%
- Elevation: 1,063 ft (324 m)

Population (2020)
  - Total: 6,481
  - Estimate (2023): 6,617
  - Density: 1,183.8/sq mi (457.07/km^{2})
- Time zone: UTC-4 (EST)
  - Summer (DST): UTC-4 (EDT)
- Zip code: 45133
- Area codes: 937, 326
- FIPS code: 39-35560
- GNIS feature ID: 2394385
- Website: www.hillsboroohio.net

Hillsboro is a city in and the county seat of Highland County, Ohio, United States, approximately 35 miles (56 km) west of Chillicothe and 50 miles (80 km) east of Cincinnati. The population was 6,481 at the 2020 census.

== History ==
Hillsboro was platted in 1807, and most likely named for the hills near the original town site. One of the late 19th century's largest reform organizations, the Woman's Christian Temperance Union that went on to play important roles in achieving women's suffrage and prohibition, was founded in Hillsboro in 1873.

A 200-year old building on West Main Street collapsed on 3 June 2019.

== Geography ==
According to the United States Census Bureau, the city has a total area of 5.43 square miles (14.06 km^{2}), all land.

Hillsboro is located at the junction of U.S. Routes 50 and 62 and State Routes 73, 124, 138, and 247.

=== Climate ===
Climate data for Hillsboro, Ohio, 1991–2020 normals, extremes 1893–present
Month	Jan	Feb	Mar	Apr	May	Jun	Jul	Aug	Sep	Oct	Nov	Dec	Year
Record high °F (°C)	76 (24)	77 (25)	85 (29)	94 (34)	99 (37)	103 (39)	105 (41)	103 (39)	105 (41)	95 (35)	85 (29)	76 (24)	105 (41)
Mean maximum °F (°C)	61.6 (16.4)	64.2 (17.9)	73.1 (22.8)	79.7 (26.5)	85.0 (29.4)	89.4 (31.9)	91.0 (32.8)	90.2 (32.3)	88.0 (31.1)	81.7 (27.6)	71.1 (21.7)	62.6 (17.0)	92.1 (33.4)
Mean daily maximum °F (°C)	38.8 (3.8)	42.5 (5.8)	52.5 (11.4)	64.7 (18.2)	73.6 (23.1)	81.5 (27.5)	84.6 (29.2)	83.4 (28.6)	78.0 (25.6)	66.7 (19.3)	53.8 (12.1)	43.1 (6.2)	63.6 (17.6)
Daily mean °F (°C)	29.1 (−1.6)	32.0 (0.0)	40.9 (4.9)	52.0 (11.1)	61.8 (16.6)	70.0 (21.1)	73.2 (22.9)	71.8 (22.1)	65.5 (18.6)	54.3 (12.4)	42.7 (5.9)	33.8 (1.0)	52.3 (11.3)
Mean daily minimum °F (°C)	19.4 (−7.0)	21.5 (−5.8)	29.4 (−1.4)	39.2 (4.0)	49.9 (9.9)	58.5 (14.7)	61.8 (16.6)	60.2 (15.7)	53.0 (11.7)	41.8 (5.4)	31.6 (−0.2)	24.6 (−4.1)	40.9 (5.0)
Mean minimum °F (°C)	0.2 (−17.7)	3.6 (−15.8)	13.5 (−10.3)	25.2 (−3.8)	36.8 (2.7)	47.6 (8.7)	54.0 (12.2)	51.4 (10.8)	41.2 (5.1)	29.5 (−1.4)	19.0 (−7.2)	9.8 (−12.3)	−3.2 (−19.6)
Record low °F (°C)	−23 (−31)	−30 (−34)	−10 (−23)	11 (−12)	23 (−5)	37 (3)	41 (5)	38 (3)	25 (−4)	11 (−12)	−1 (−18)	−23 (−31)	−30 (−34)
Average precipitation inches (mm)	3.44 (87)	3.26 (83)	4.20 (107)	4.85 (123)	5.06 (129)	4.82 (122)	4.25 (108)	3.72 (94)	3.17 (81)	3.19 (81)	3.10 (79)	3.62 (92)	46.68 (1,186)
Average snowfall inches (cm)	6.9 (18)	5.0 (13)	3.4 (8.6)	0.2 (0.51)	0.0 (0.0)	0.0 (0.0)	0.0 (0.0)	0.0 (0.0)	0.0 (0.0)	0.2 (0.51)	0.2 (0.51)	2.2 (5.6)	18.1 (46.73)
Average precipitation days (≥ 0.01 in)	12.7	11.7	13.1	13.3	13.9	12.3	11.4	9.8	9.4	9.8	10.5	12.6	140.5
Average snowy days (≥ 0.1 in)	3.6	3.2	1.6	0.3	0.0	0.0	0.0	0.0	0.0	0.1	0.4	1.5	10.7
Source 1: NOAA
Source 2: National Weather Service

== Demographics ==
Historical population
Census	Pop.	Note	%±
1810	220		—
1820	508		130.9%
1830	566		11.4%
1840	1,021		80.4%
1850	1,392		36.3%
1860	2,171		56.0%
1870	2,818		29.8%
1880	3,234		14.8%
1890	3,620		11.9%
1900	4,535		25.3%
1910	4,296		−5.3%
1920	4,356		1.4%
1930	4,040		−7.3%
1940	4,713		16.7%
1950	5,126		8.8%
1960	5,474		6.8%
1970	5,584		2.0%
1980	6,356		13.8%
1990	6,235		−1.9%
2000	6,368		2.1%
2010	6,605		3.7%
2020	6,481		−1.9%
2023 (est.)	6,617		2.1%

=== 2020 census ===
As of the 2020 census, Hillsboro had a population of 6,481. The median age was 41.4 years. 22.5% of residents were under the age of 18 and 23.3% of residents were 65 years of age or older. For every 100 females there were 86.6 males, and for every 100 females age 18 and over there were 81.2 males age 18 and over.

100.0% of residents lived in urban areas, while 0.0% lived in rural areas.

There were 2,834 households in Hillsboro, of which 27.1% had children under the age of 18 living in them. Of all households, 33.0% were married-couple households, 20.1% were households with a male householder and no spouse or partner present, and 38.0% were households with a female householder and no spouse or partner present. About 40.3% of all households were made up of individuals and 20.5% had someone living alone who was 65 years of age or older.

There were 3,187 housing units, of which 11.1% were vacant. The homeowner vacancy rate was 3.3% and the rental vacancy rate was 5.8%.

Racial composition as of the 2020 census
Race	Number	Percent
White	5,756	88.8%
Black or African American	287	4.4%
American Indian and Alaska Native	36	0.6%
Asian	52	0.8%
Native Hawaiian and Other Pacific Islander	4	0.1%
Some other race	52	0.8%
Two or more races	294	4.5%
Hispanic or Latino (of any race)	95	1.5%

=== 2010 census ===
As of the census of 2010, there were 6,605 people, 2,755 households, and 1,612 families living in the city. The population density was 1,216.4 inhabitants per square mile (469.7/km^{2}). There were 3,181 housing units at an average density of 585.8 per square mile (226.2/km^{2}). The racial makeup of the city was 90.0% White, 5.8% African American, 0.3% Native American, 0.8% Asian, 0.2% from other races, and 2.9% from two or more races. Hispanic or Latino of any race were 1.3% of the population.

There were 2,755 households, of which 30.5% had children under the age of 18 living with them, 37.7% were married couples living together, 16.5% had a female householder with no husband present, 4.3% had a male householder with no wife present, and 41.5% were non-families. 37.1% of all households were made up of individuals, and 18.2% had someone living alone who was 65 years of age or older. The average household size was 2.28 and the average family size was 2.97.

The median age in the city was 38.7 years. 24.3% of residents were under the age of 18; 9.1% were between the ages of 18 and 24; 24.1% were from 25 to 44; 22.4% were from 45 to 64; and 20.1% were 65 years of age or older. The gender makeup of the city was 44.9% male and 55.1% female.

=== 2000 census ===
As of the census of 2000, there were 6,368 people, 2,686 households, and 1,633 families living in the city. The population density was 1,227.1 inhabitants per square mile (473.8/km^{2}). There were 2,971 housing units at an average density of 572.5 per square mile (221.0/km^{2}). The racial makeup of the city was 90.58% White, 6.39% African American, 0.20% Native American, 1.07% Asian, 0.03% Pacific Islander, 0.38% from other races, and 1.35% from two or more races. Hispanic or Latino of any race were 0.94% of the population.

There were 2,686 households, out of which 28.6% had children under the age of 18 living with them, 43.8% were married couples living together, 13.6% had a female householder with no husband present, and 39.2% were non-families. 35.8% of all households were made up of individuals, and 18.2% had someone living alone who was 65 years of age or older. The average household size was 2.26 and the average family size was 2.93.

In the city, the population was spread out, with 24.2% under the age of 18, 9.9% from 18 to 24, 23.9% from 25 to 44, 20.7% from 45 to 64, and 21.3% who were 65 years of age or older. The median age was 39 years. For every 100 females, there were 82.8 males. For every 100 females age 18 and over, there were 75.9 males.

The median income for a household in the city was $25,998, and the median income for a family was $34,750. Males had a median income of $30,984 versus $22,665 for females. The per capita income for the city was $15,400. About 13.5% of families and 18.1% of the population were below the poverty line, including 27.6% of those under age 18 and 11.7% of those age 65 or over.

== Economy ==
Hillsboro has produced steel alloy bells, which were shipped around the world.

== Arts and culture ==
Since 1976 the city hosts the "Festival of the Bells" during the fourth of July weekend.

Hillsboro has a public library, a branch of the Highland County District Library.

== Education ==
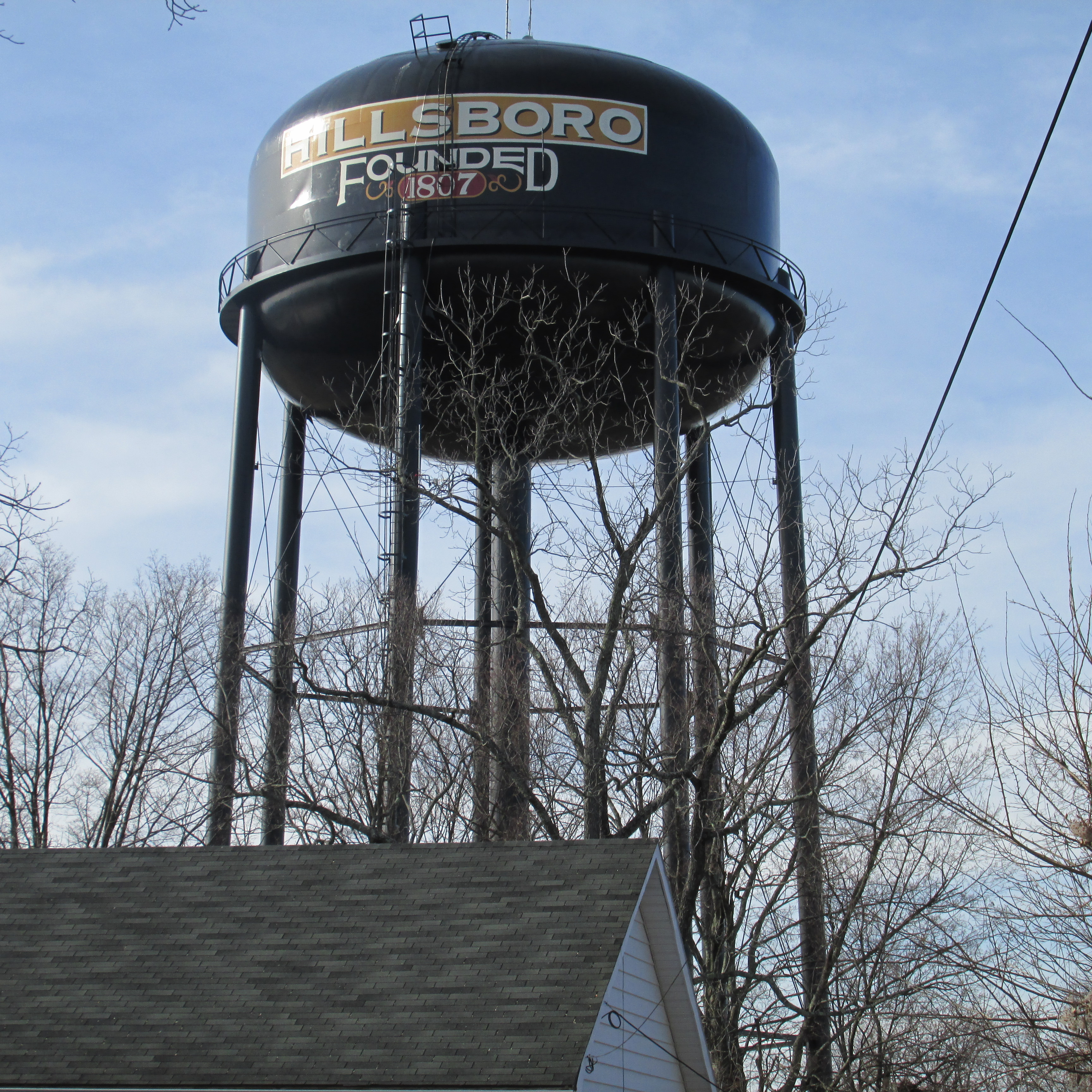
Oak Street Water Tower, constructed 1962

Hillsboro City Schools operates two public elementary schools, one middle school, and Hillsboro High School. Parochial schools in Hillsboro include Hillsboro Christian Academy and St. Mary Catholic Elementary School.

The Central Campus of Southern State Community College is located within the city.

== Media ==
=== Newspapers ===
- The Highland County Press — weekly
- The Times-Gazette — daily except Sunday and Monday

=== Radio ===
- WLRU-LP - Catholic programming
- WSRW — country music format

== Infrastructure ==
=== Transportation ===
The Highland County Airport is located three nautical miles (3.5 mi; 5.6 km) southeast of Hillsboro's central business district.

== Notable people ==
- John J. Ballentine, U.S. Navy admiral
- Robert N. Baskin, mayor of Salt Lake City (1892 – 1895)
- Milton Caniff, cartoonist (Terry and the Pirates, Steve Canyon)
- Joe Crawford, Major League Baseball Player
- Edwin Hamilton Davis, physician and archaeologist
- Jonas R. Emrie, U.S. Representative, and postmaster of Hillsboro (1939 - 1941)
- Hugh Fullerton, sportswriter who exposed the 1919 Black Sox Scandal
- Drew Hastings, comedian and former mayor of the city
- Joseph J. McDowell, U.S. Representative
- Bob McEwen, U.S. Representative (1981 - 1993)
- William H. McSurely, Illinois state legislator and judge
- Jacob J. Pugsley, U.S. Representative
- Moses F. Shinn, Methodist Episcopal Church minister
- John Armstrong Smith, U.S. Representative (1869 - 1873)
- Eliza Thompson, temperance advocate who inspired the founding of the Woman's Christian Temperance Union.
- Allen Trimble, 8th & 10th Governor of Ohio (1822, 1826 - 1830)
- Brad Wenstrup, U.S. representative (2013–2025)
- Kirby White, MLB player
- Wilbur M. White, U.S. Representative
- Jimmy Yeary, country singer and songwriter
