= Komako =

- Gender: Female

Origin
- Origin: Japanese
- Meaning: Different meanings depending on the kanji used

Komako (written: 駒子) is a feminine Japanese given name. Notable people with the name include:

- Komako Hara (原 駒子; 1910–1968), Japanese actress
- Komako Kimura (木村 駒子; 1887–1980), Japanese suffragist, actress, dancer, theatre manager and magazine editor
