= Beckers Corners, New York =

Coordinates: 42°32′54″N 73°48′39″W

Beckers Corners is a hamlet, in the town of Bethlehem, in Albany County, in the U.S. state of New York.

== History ==
A post office Beckers Corners was in operation from 1873 until 1900. The community was named after the local Becker family.
