= Cripplebush Creek =

Location
- Country: United States
- State: New York

Physical characteristics
- Source
  - location: Schoharie County, New York
- Mouth: Schoharie Creek
  - location: Central Bridge, Schoharie County, New York, United States
  - coordinates: 42°44′21″N 74°19′54″W
- Basin size: 10.1 mi^{2} (26 km^{2})

Cripplebush Creek is a small stream that flows into Schoharie Creek north of Central Bridge, New York.
