= Diocletian Lewis =

American physician

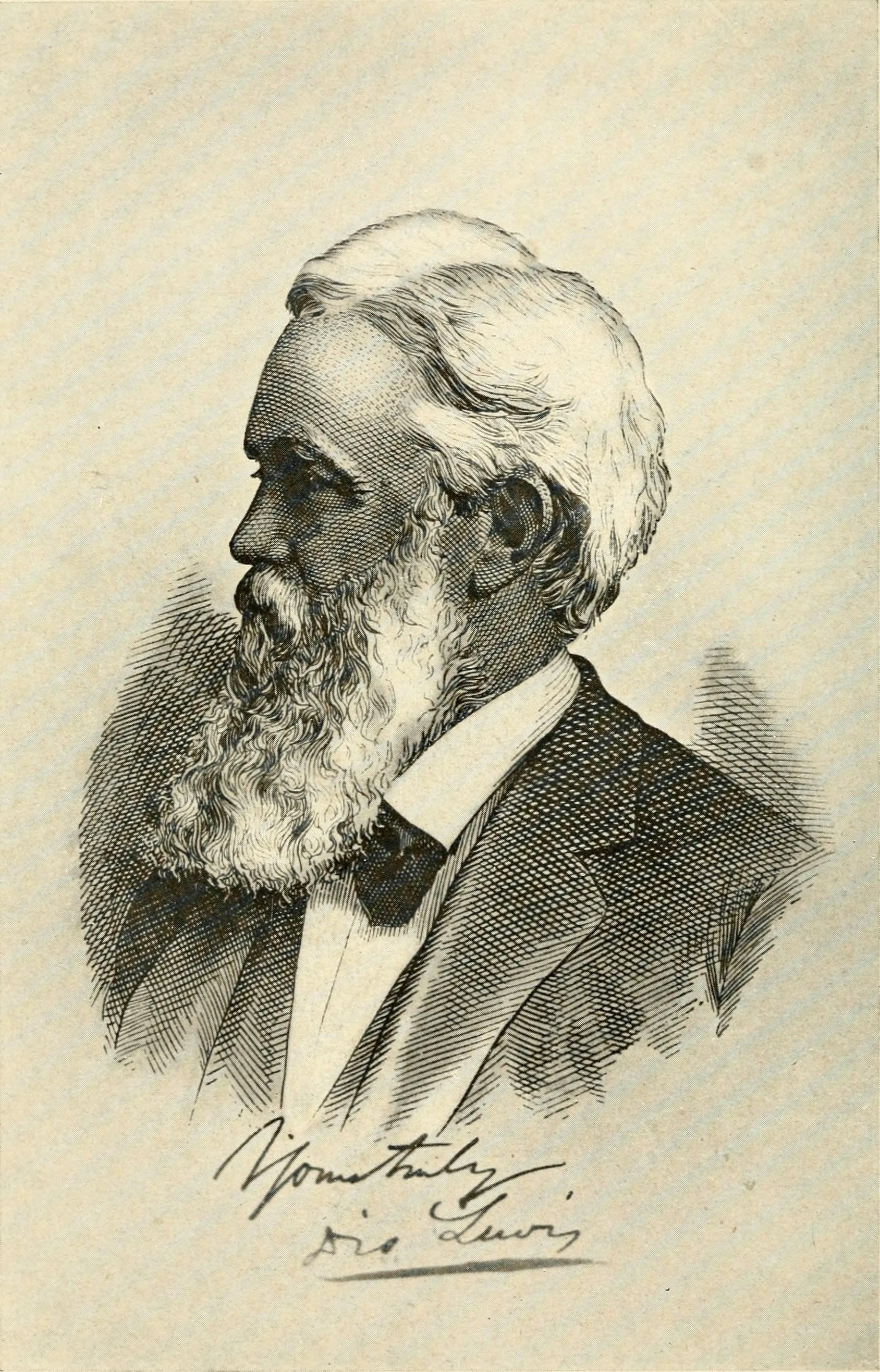
- Born: March 3, 1823; Auburn, New York
- Died: May 21, 1886 (aged 63)
- Other name: Dr. Dio Lewis
- Occupations: Temperance leader, physical culture advocate

Diocletian Lewis (March 3, 1823 – May 21, 1886), commonly known as Dr. Dio Lewis, was a prominent temperance leader and physical culture advocate who practiced homeopathy.

== Biography ==
=== Early life ===
He was born on a farm near Auburn, New York. He left school at 12 to work in a cotton factory. He later worked at a hoe, axe and scythe factory and returned to school.

He started teaching school at 15. At 18, he organized a school in Lower Sandusky, Ohio (now Fremont). He extended the curriculum to include algebra, geometry, Greek and Latin. This so impressed the townsfolk that they constructed a building for the school, and when a certificate of incorporation was obtained for it, they named the school the Diocletian Institute in his honor. He had to work hard at his own studies to stay ahead of his pupils. Severe illness obligated him to give up the school after a year, and he never returned.

=== Medical training and career ===
He decided to go into medicine, and worked for three years in the office of the physician for the Auburn State Prison. He then studied at the Harvard Medical School. Apparently a lack of funds prevented him from finishing the course there, and upon leaving he immediately opened up a medical practice in Port Byron, New York. His partner in that practice, Lewis McCarthy, interested him in homeopathy, and he attended the Homeopathic Hospital College of Cleveland, Ohio. In 1848, he opened a practice in Buffalo, New York. He only received a degree in homeopathic studies and no M.D.; however, this was not a problem since there were no medical licensing laws in 1848. He began a monthly publication called The Homœopathist.

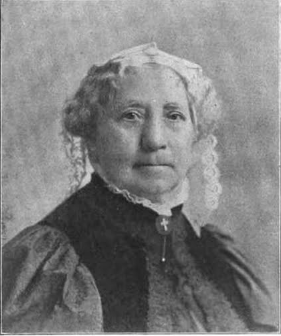
Helen Cecelia Clarke Lewis (Mrs. Diocletian Lewis)

After a year in Buffalo, he married Helen Cecelia Clarke. In 1852, he gave up his practice and went south with her on behalf of her health. Three of her sisters had died of tuberculosis, and she was showing signs of the same disease. Lewis claimed to have used homeopathy to cure his wife Helen's TB, and from that day his so-called "Consumption Cure" became well-known and profitable. Helen worked with Lewis on his publications, writing her own column on dress reform and woman's health.

=== Lectures ===
From 1852 till 1860 Lewis was engaged in lecturing on hygiene, temperance and physiology. He began by lecturing on health topics in schools, and then in 1853 gave his first public lecture, addressing the topic of “The Influence of Christian Women in the Cause of Temperance”. This lecture stemmed from his experience in joining an organization called “The Sons of Temperance”: he had met indifference when he brought up the topic of having women in the organization. In 1856 he visited Paris for a short time to obtain material for his physiology lectures and used the opportunity to attend clinics in some of the city hospitals.

=== New exercise system ===
While lecturing, Lewis began developing a new system of exercises. He felt that, although athletic young men could succeed in the feats required by German gymnastics then prevalent, these exercises did not meet the needs of those who most needed the benefit: boys; old, fat or feeble men; and girls and women. By June 1860, he felt he had developed a satisfactory system, and settled in the vicinity of Boston to publicize it, feeling that “Boston would prove more hospitable to an educational innovation than any other city in the country.” He was not disappointed.

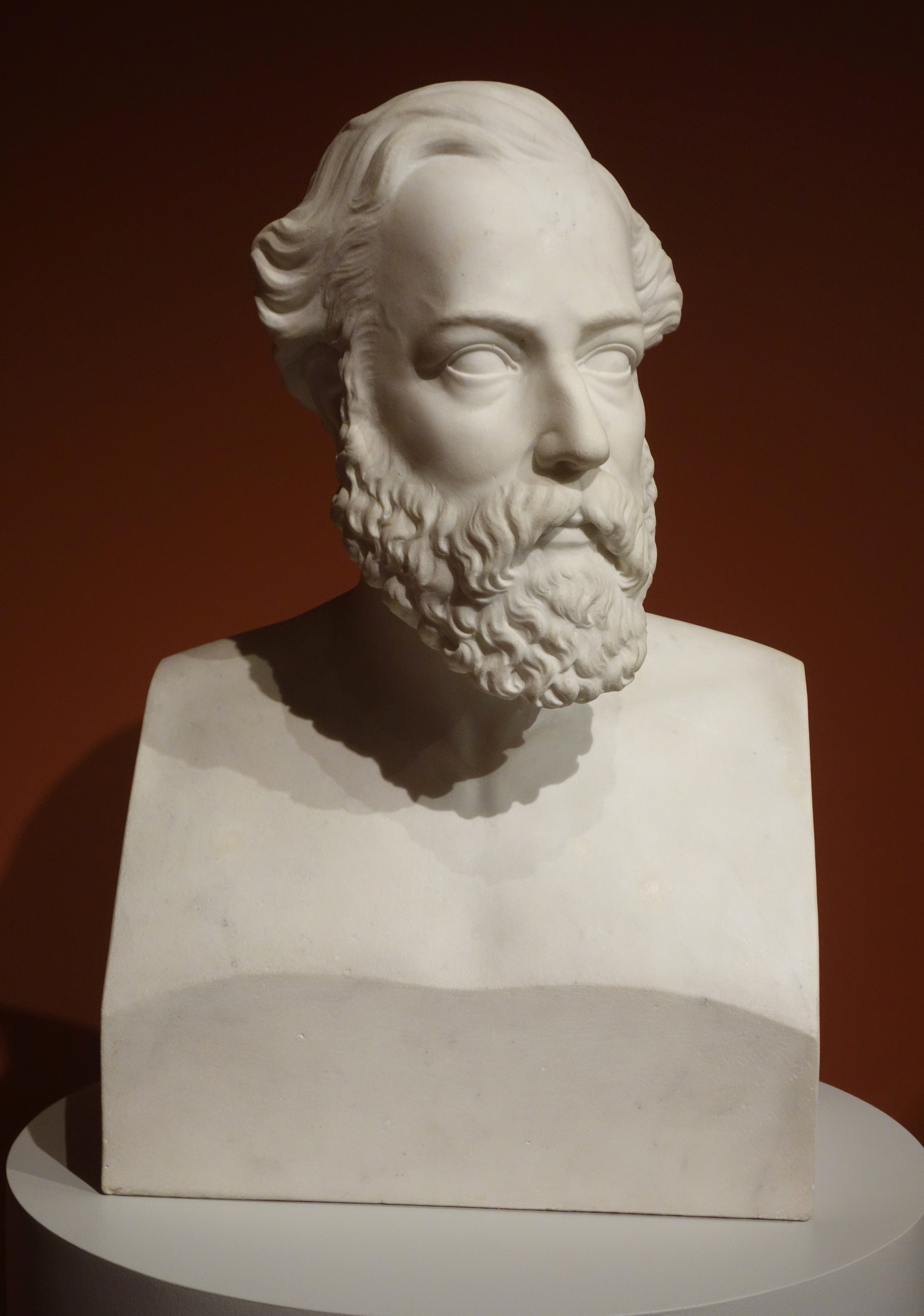
Marble bust of Diocletian Lewis by Edmonia Lewis, 1868 (Walters Art Museum)

Evening classes in gymnastics were organized in West Newton, Newtonville, Newton, Newton Upper Falls, and Watertown. The new system was introduced in a normal school in Framingham, the Concord Hall school and schools in Boston. A public gym for men, women and children opened at 20 Essex Street in Boston. A lecture at a conference in Boston in August 1860 brought the new system to the attention of educators from across the United States.

In the spring of 1861, Lewis founded the Normal Institute for Physical Education (also known as Boston Normal Physical Training School). Cornelius C. Felton, president of Harvard, readily consented to serve as its president. Among the 28 directors appeared the names of Governor John A. Andrew, George S. Boutwell, H. I. Bowditch, Rev. James Freeman Clarke, Edward Everett Hale, N. T. Allen and A. Crosby. The members of the first faculty were Thomas H. Hoskins, M.D., professor of anatomy; Josiah Curtis, M.D., professor of physiology; Walter Channing, M.D., professor of hygiene; and Dio Lewis, M.D., professor of gymnastics. In seven years, five hundred pupils were graduated. Lewis's influence had much to do with the establishment of the present system of physical culture in most of the institutions of learning in the United States.

=== Girls' school ===
For three years, 1864–1867, Lewis ran a school for girls at Lexington, Massachusetts, in which Theodore Dwight Weld was a leading teacher, and Catharine Beecher was for a time one of the lecturers. In September 1867, the school building was burned, and, although temporary quarters were at once secured in a summer hotel at Spy Pond, the project was abandoned at the close of another year. The number of pupils rose to 140 in the third year, drawn from all over the country, and nearly 300 were enrolled during the whole period.

=== Temperance crusading ===
In the 1870s, Lewis and his mother began leading groups of followers into saloons to pray for their closure. He later lectured in churches claiming miraculous results from conducting such "Visitation Bands". Lewis’ actions and lectures inspired others to similar action, thus initiating the Women's Crusade against alcohol.

Lewis gave a public address in Hillsboro, Ohio, on his fall tour through Ohio called "Our Girls", that advocated physical exercise and an active life for women. On Sundays he spoke on "The Duty of Christian Women in the Cause of Temperance". In these lectures he instructed women to ask local dispensers of alcoholic beverages to sign pledges that they would cease to sell. Upon refusal, the women should begin prayer and song services in these establishments. He urged women to be the sole participants in these acts, in order to aggrandize the emotional force of the movement.

Women took to the snowy streets, and within three months of their first march, they had driven the liquor business out of 250 towns. By the time the marches ended, over 912 communities in 31 states and territories had experienced the crusades.

It was and is still the largest mass movement of women to date.... [Frances Willard], the second national president of the Woman's Christian Temperance Union, wrote later in her memoirs, that the crusade “was like the fires we used to kindle on the western prairies, a match and a wisp of grass were all that was needed, and behold the spectacle of a prairie on fire sweeping across the landscape, swift as a thousand untrained steeds and no more to be captured than a hurricane".

Lewis claimed that, as a result of them, more than 17,000 drinking establishments were abandoned in Ohio alone in a period of two months. Most of the saloons that closed as a result of prayer vigils opened again a few days later to meet the public demand for alcoholic beverages.

== Family ==
Lewis was the brother of jurist and politician Loran L. Lewis.

== Works ==
- The New Gymnastics (1862)
- Weak Lungs and How to Make them Strong (1863)
- Talks About People's Stomachs (1870)
- Our Girls (1871)
- Chats with Young Women (1871)
- "Our Digestion /or, My Jolly Friend's Secret" (1872)
- Chastity (1872)
- Gypsies (1881)
- In a Nutshell (1883)
