= Memoirs of the literary ladies of England from the commencement of the last century =

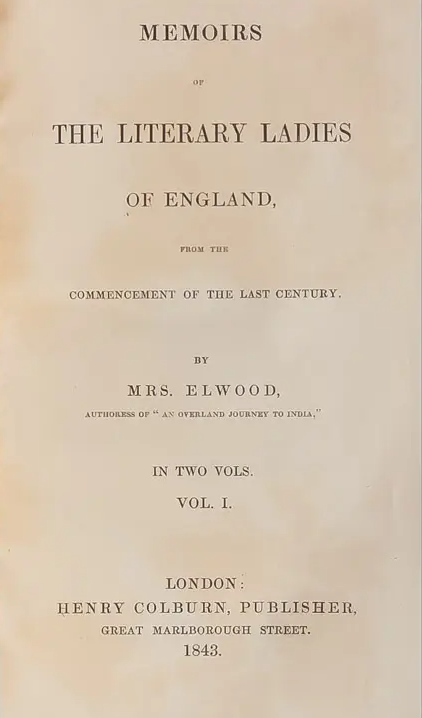
- Volume one
- Author: Anne Elwood
- Subject: women writers
- Genre: literary biography
- Published: London
- Publisher: London: H. Colburn, 1843, Philadelphia: G.B. Zieber, 1845
- Publication date: 1843
- Pages: 2 v. fronts. (ports.) 19 cm.
- OCLC: 2527492
- LC Class: 13011830

Memoirs of the literary ladies of England from the commencement of the last century (1843), by Anne Elwood, is a group biography of British women writers of the eighteenth and early nineteenth centuries.

The Memoirs are dedicated to Elwood's late mother, Mary Curteis. The subjects are not all English, despite the title: Frances Sheridan was Anglo-Irish, Hester Thrale Piozzi was Welsh-born, and Grizel Baillie, Anne Grant, Elizabeth Hamilton and Mary Brunton were Scottish. In the brief preface, Elwood writes that she undertook the project as there was little else published to "gratify her curiosity" about "the lives and characters" of "Literary Females". She concludes, with the modesty that was in style at that time, that the work is not intended for scholars, and requests that critics not be too severe.

The first edition was published in two volumes in London by H. Colburn in 1843. It features twenty-nine subjects arranged chronologically by birth, fifteen in the first volume and fourteen in the second. A portrait of Felicia Hemans forms the frontispiece for the first volume, and one of Letitia Elizabeth Landon serves in the second.

The first U.S. edition, essentially an abridgement, comprises one volume and features eighteen of the original twenty-nine subjects.

Memoirs was reprinted by the AMS Press in 1973.

Modern scholars have commented on the novelty of Elwood's project. Linda Peterson writes that the gender of the writers was the basic principle for inclusion in the collection, rather than the more usual categories of nationality or poetic genre. In this, Elwood, with "canon-making intentions", was pointing to the existence of "a field of writing for women only".

== 1st edition (1843) ==
=== Volume I ===
- Mary Wortley Montague
- Grizel Baillie
- Frances Seymour
- Mary Delaney
- Elizabeth Carter
- Catherine Talbot
- Elizabeth Montagu
- Frances Sheridan
- Hester Chapone
- Sarah Trimmer
- Anna Barbauld
- Anna Seward
- Hannah More
- Charlotte Smith
- Elizabeth Inchbald

=== Volume II ===
- Hester Thrale Piozzi
- Frances Burney
- Anne Grant
- Elizabeth Hamilton
- Mary Wollstonecraft
- Ann Radcliffe
- Jane Austen
- Elizabeth Smith
- Mary Brunton
- Felicia Hemans
- Jane Taylor
- Anna Maria Porter
- Letitia Elizabeth Landon
- Emma Roberts

== Philadelphia edition (1845) ==
- Mary Wortley Montague
- Mary Delaney
- Elizabeth Carter
- Catherine Talbot
- Elizabeth Montagu
- Frances Sheridan
- Hester Chapone
- Anna Barbauld
- Anna Seward
- Hannah More
- Charlotte Smith
- Elizabeth Inchbald
- Hester Thrale Piozzi
- Frances Burney
- Anne Grant
- Elizabeth Hamilton
- Felicia Hemans
- Letitia Elizabeth Landon

== Etexts ==
- Memoirs of the literary ladies of England from the commencement of the last century. London: H. Colburn, 1843. (Vol. I, Vol. II, Google; Vol. I, Vol. II, Internet Archive)
- Memoirs of the literary ladies of England, from the commencement of the last century. By Mrs. Elwood. Philadelphia, G.B. Zieber and Co., 1845. (Etext, Internet Archive; Etext, HathiTrust)

== See also ==
- Collective 18th-century biographies of literary women
- List of biographical dictionaries of women writers in English
- Wikisource: Biographical dictionaries
- Women's writing (literary category)
