= Klopstock (surname) =

Klopstock [ˈklɔpʃtɔk] is a German surname. Notable people with the surname include:

- Friedrich Gottlieb Klopstock (1724–1803), German poet
- Margareta "Meta" Klopstock, born Moller (1728–1758), a German writer, wife of Friedrich Gottlieb
