= François-Jean Willemain d'Abancourt =

French man of letters and bibliophile

François-Jean Willemain d'Abancourt (22 July 1745, Paris – 16 June 1803, Paris) was a French man of letters and bibliophile.

Willemain wrote a great number of books, including some poems, plays and fables, most of them inserted in the Mercure de France (1777), tragedies, epistles and drama essays. He also translated into verse the tragedy Der Tod Adams (1757) by Friedrich Gottlieb Klopstock.

He is best known for the beautiful collection of plays he gathered because he would acquire them at any price in all editions and manuscripts. He also wrote under the pseudonym "Léonard Gobemouche".

== Sources ==
- "François-Jean Willemain d'Abancourt", in Charles Weiss, Biographie universelle, ou Dictionnaire historique contenant la nécrologie des hommes célèbres de tous les pays, 1841
