= Carlo Belli (1742–1816) =

Abbot, literature, poet and translator (1742–1816)

Carlo Belli (1742–1816) was an Italian poet and translator of contemporary German works.

He was born in Venice. He had become a Jesuit priest, but left the order when it was suppressed in 1773. Among his publications were:

- Della Messiade (1774), translated from the work in German of Der Messias by Friedrich Gottlieb Klopstok
- La quattro parti del giorno (1778), translated from the work in German of Der Messias by Justus Friedrich Wilhelm Zachariae
- Il Ventaglio, Venice (1782): poem written for Paolina Contarini on her marriage to Giuseppe Giovanelli
- Gli Ucelli, ejemplare alle cura materna, stanze morali (1817)
