= Letitia Elizabeth Landon =

British poet and novelist (1802–1838)

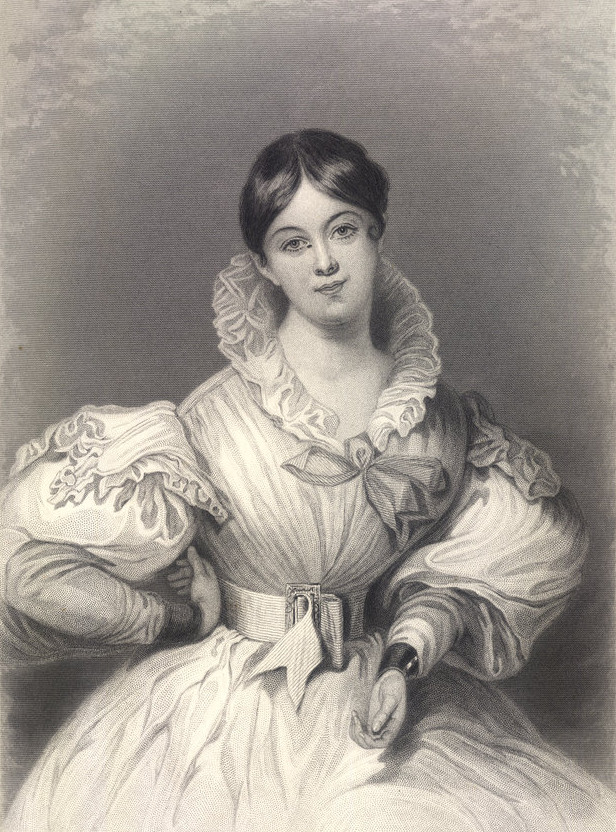
- Letitia Elizabeth Landon (1802–1838); variation of the original painting by Daniel Maclise
- Born: 14 August 1802; Chelsea, Middlesex, England
- Died: 15 October 1838 (aged 36); Cape Coast Castle, Ashanti Empire (now in Ghana)
- Other names: Letitia Elizabeth Maclean; L. E. L. Iole
- Occupation: Writer
- Known for: Poetry; Fiction; Reviews
- Style: Post-Romantic
- Spouse: George Maclean (m. 1838)

Signature
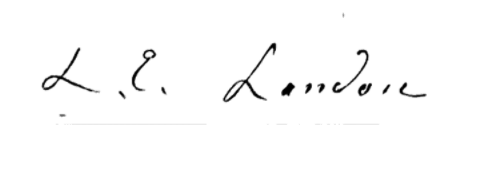

Letitia Elizabeth Landon (14 August 1802 – 15 October 1838) was an English poet and novelist, better known by her initials L.E.L. Her first major breakthrough came with The Improvisatrice and she developed the metrical romance towards the Victorian ideal of the Victorian monologue, influencing fellow English writers such as Elizabeth Barrett Browning, Robert Browning, Alfred Tennyson and Christina Rossetti. Her influence can also be found in the United States, where she was very popular. Edgar Allan Poe regarded her genius as self-evident.

In spite of her wide influence, due to the perceived immorality of Landon's lifestyle, her works were largely ignored or misrepresented after her death. Landon's writings are emblematic of the transition from Romanticism to Victorian literature.

== Early life ==
Letitia Elizabeth Landon was born on 14 August 1802 in Chelsea, London to John Landon and Catherine Jane, née Bishop. A precocious child, Landon learned to read as a toddler; a disabled neighbour would scatter letter tiles on the floor and reward young Letitia for reading, and, according to her father, "she used to bring home many rewards".

At the age of five, Landon began attending Frances Arabella Rowden's school at 22 Hans Place, Knightsbridge. Rowden was an engaging teacher, a poet, and had a particular enthusiasm for the theatre. According to Mary Russell Mitford, "she had a knack of making poetesses of her pupils". Other pupils of Rowden include Caroline Ponsonby, later Lady Caroline Lamb; Emma Roberts, the travel writer; Anna Maria Fielding, who published as Mrs S. C. Hall; and Rosina Doyle Wheeler, who married Edward Bulwer-Lytton and published her many novels as Rosina Bulwer Lytton. At Rowden's school, Landon became fluent in French from an early age.

The Landons moved to the countryside in 1809, so that John Landon could carry out a model farm project. Letitia Landon was educated at home by her older cousin Elizabeth from that point on. Elizabeth found her knowledge and abilities outstripped by those of her pupil: "When I asked Letitia any question relating either to history, geography, grammar – Plutarch's Lives, or to any book we had been reading, I was pretty certain her answers would be perfectly correct; still, not exactly recollecting, and unwilling she should find out just then that I was less learned than herself, I used thus to question her: 'Are you quite certain?' ... I never knew her to be wrong."

When young, Landon was close to her younger brother, Whittington Henry, born 1804. Paying for university education for him, at Worcester College, Oxford, was one of the reasons that brought Landon to publish. She also supported his preferment and later (in Fisher's Drawing Room Scrap Book, 1838) dedicated her poetical illustration Captain Cook to him, in recollection of their domestic childhood adventures together. Whittington went on to become a minister and published a book of sermons in 1835. Rather than showing appreciation for his sister's assistance, he spread false rumours about her marriage and death. Landon also had a younger sister, Elizabeth Jane (born 1806), who was a frail child and died in 1819 at the age of 13. Little is known of Elizabeth, but her death likely left a lasting impression on Letitia, and it could be Elizabeth who is referred to in the poem "The Forgotten One" ("I have no early flowers to fling").

== Literary career ==
=== Early career: 1820–1834 ===
An agricultural depression caused the Landon family to move back to London in 1815. There, John Landon met William Jerdan, editor of The Literary Gazette. According to Mrs A. T. Thomson, Jerdan took notice of the young Letitia Landon when he saw her coming down the street, "trundling a hoop with one hand, and holding in the other a book of poems, of which she was catching a glimpse between the agitating course of her evolutions". Jerdan later described her ideas as "original and extraordinary". He encouraged Landon's poetic endeavours, and her first poem was published under the single initial "L" in the Gazette in 1820, when Landon was 18. The following year, with financial support from her grandmother, Landon published a book of poetry, The Fate of Adelaide, under her full name. The book met with little critical notice, but sold well; Landon, however, received no profits, since the publisher shortly went out of business. The same month that The Fate of Adelaide appeared, Landon published two poems under the initials "L.E.L." in the Gazette; these poems, and the initials under which they were published, attracted much discussion and speculation. As contemporary critic Laman Blanchard put it, the initials L.E.L. "speedily became a signature of magical interest and curiosity". Bulwer Lytton wrote that, as a young college student, he and his classmates would

rush every Saturday afternoon for the Literary Gazette, [with] an impatient anxiety to hasten at once to that corner of the sheet which contained the three magical letters L.E.L. And all of us praised the verse, and all of us guessed at the author. We soon learned it was a female, and our admiration was doubled, and our conjectures tripled.

Landon served as the Gazette's chief reviewer as she continued to write poetry and she soon began to display an interest in art, which she projected into her poetic productions. She began, in innovative fashion, with a series on Medallion Wafers, which were commercially produced highly decorative letter seals. This was closely followed in the Literary Gazette by a Poetical Catalogue of Pictures, which was to be 'continued occasionally' and which in fact continued unremarked into 1824, the year her landmark volume, The Improvisatrice; and Other Poems was published. A further group of these poems was published in 1825 in her next volume, The Troubadour, as Poetical Sketches of Modern Pictures. In The Troubadour she included a lament for her late father, who died in 1824, thus forcing her to write to support her family; Some contemporaries saw this profit-motive as detrimental to the quality of Landon's work: a woman was not supposed to be a professional writer. Also, by 1826, Landon's reputation began to suffer as rumours circulated that she had had affairs or secretly borne children. However, her further volumes of poetry continued to be favourably reviewed, these being The Golden Violet with its Tales of Romance and Chivalry and Other Poems (1827) and The Venetian Bracelet, The Lost Pleiad, A History of the Lyre, and Other Poems (1829). During these years she became known as the 'female Byron'.

The new trend of annual gift books provided her with new opportunities for continuing her engagement with art through combinations of an engraved artwork and what she came to call 'a poetical illustration'. In the 1830s she became a highly valued artist in this field, included amongst her work, most of the poetry for Fisher's Drawing Room Scrap Books from 1832 through to 1839. Sarah Sheppard describes this work thus: 'How did pictures ever seem to speak to her soul! how would she seize on some interesting characteristic in the painting or engraving before her, and inspire it with new life, till that pictured scene spread before you in bright association with some touching history or spirit-stirring poem! L.E.L.'s appreciation of painting, like that of music, was intellectual rather than mechanical,—belonging to the combinations rather than to the details; she loved the poetical effects and suggestive influences of the Arts, although caring not for their mere technicalities.' In the words of Glenn T. Hines, 'What L.E.L.'s readers appreciated in her creations was that "new life" that she brought to her subject. Her imaginative re-castings produced intellectual pleasure for her audience. The wonderful characteristic of L.E.L.'s writings, which her readers recognized, was the author's special creative capacity to bring new meanings to her audience.'

Landon continued to publish poetry, and published her first work of prose in 1831 with her first novel, Romance and Reality. The following year, she produced her only volume of religious poetry, The Easter Gift, again as illustrations to engravings of artwork. Next she was responsible for the whole of Heath's Book of Beauty, 1833, her most self-consciously Byronic volume, which opens with The Enchantress in which she creates a 'Promethean, distinctly Luciferan, model of poetic identity and self-creation'. She returned to the long poem with The Zenana in the Drawing Room Scrap Book, 1834 and gave the 1835 Scrap Book a sting in the tale with The Fairy of the Fountains, Landon's version of the Melusine legend displaying 'the aesthetic dilemma of the woman poet who is exiled not once like the male poet, but twice'. 1834 also saw the publication of her second novel, Francesca Carrara, of which one reviewer commented 'A sterner goddess never presided over the destinies of a novel'.

In July that year Landon visited Paris with a friend, Miss Turin, who was unfortunately taken ill, restricting Landon's activities. However, amongst those she met were Heinrich Heine, Prosper Mérimée, Chateaubriand and Madame Tastu.

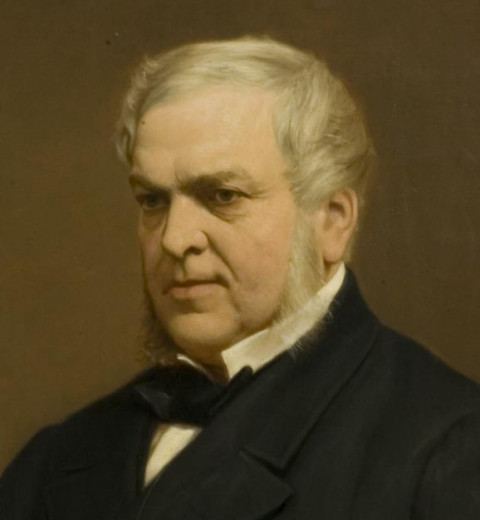
John Forster, to whom Landon was briefly engaged

=== Engagement John Forster: 1835–1836 ===
In 1835, Landon became engaged to John Forster. Forster became aware of rumours regarding Landon's sexual activity, and asked her to refute them. Landon responded that Forster should "make every inquiry in [his] power", which Forster did; after he pronounced himself satisfied, however, Landon broke off their engagement. To him, she wrote:

The more I think, the more I feel I ought not – I can not – allow you to unite yourself with one accused of – I can not write it. The mere suspicion is dreadful as death. Were it stated as a fact, that might be disproved. Were it a difficulty of any other kind, I might say, Look back at every action of my life, ask every friend I have. But what answer can I give ...? I feel that to give up all idea of a near and dear connection is as much my duty to myself as to you....

Privately, Landon stated that she would never marry a man who had mistrusted her. In a letter to Bulwer Lytton, she wrote that "if his future protection is to harass and humiliate me as much as his present – God keep me from it ... I cannot get over the entire want of delicacy to me which could repeat such slander to myself."

A further volume of poetry, The Vow of the Peacock, was published in 1835 and, in 1836, a volume of stories and poetry for children, Traits and Trials of Early Life. The History of a Child from this volume may draw on the surroundings of her childhood but the circumstances of the story are so unlike the known facts of her early life that it can scarcely be considered as autobiographical.

=== Later career ===
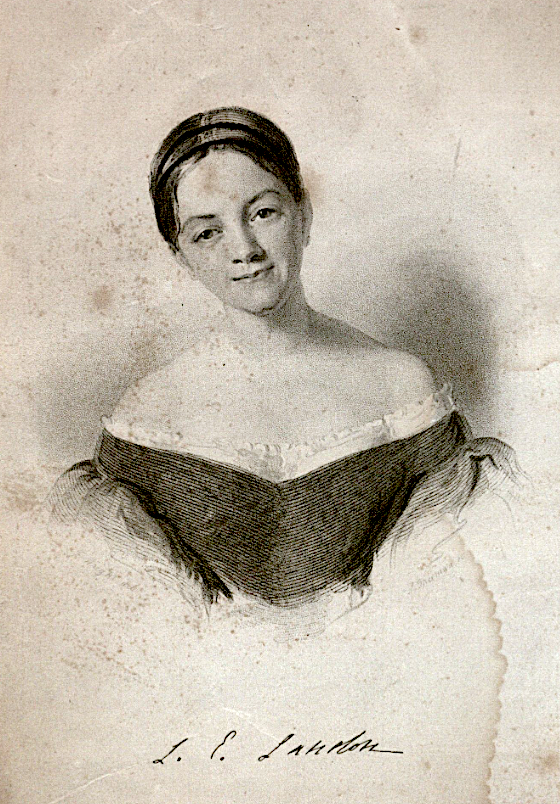
Letitia Landon, 1837

During the 1830s, Landon's poetry became more thoughtful and mature. In 1831, she became editor of the Fisher's Drawing Room Scrap Books for which she wrote the majority of the poems for the years 1832-1839, covering a wide field of subject matter, mostly in response to illustrations. In addition, some of her best poems appeared in The New Monthly Magazine culminating in the series, Subjects for Pictures, with their elaborate rhyming patterns. These are in a sense a reversal of her earlier poetical illustrations of existing pictures. Also in that magazine is the set, Three Extracts from the Diary of a Week and here, she expresses her aim in opening lines, which, in Sypher's words 'could stand as a preface to much of her poetry'.

A record of the inward world, whose facts
Are thoughts—and feelings—fears, and hopes, and dreams.
There are some days that might outmeasure years—
Days that obliterate the past, and make
The future of the colour which they cast.
A day may be a destiny; for life
Lives in but little—but that little teems
With some one chance, the balance of all time:
A look—a word—and we are wholly changed.
We marvel at ourselves—we would deny
That which is working in the hidden soul;
But the heart knows and trembles at the truth:
On such these records linger.

In 1837, Landon published another novel, Ethel Churchill, and began to explore new forms in which to express her literary talent. One of these was her dramatic tragedy, Castruccio Castracani, which represents a culmination of her development of the metrical romance, both in its form and content. Already, she had experimented with verses for Schloss's Bijou Almanacks, which measured 3/4 by 1/2 inch and were to be read with a magnifier. She also negotiated with Heath for the publication in the future of a series of Female Portraits of characters from literature. Her final endeavour was Lady Anne Granard (or Keeping up Appearances), a lighter novel, but her work on this at Cape Coast was cut short.

== Later life ==
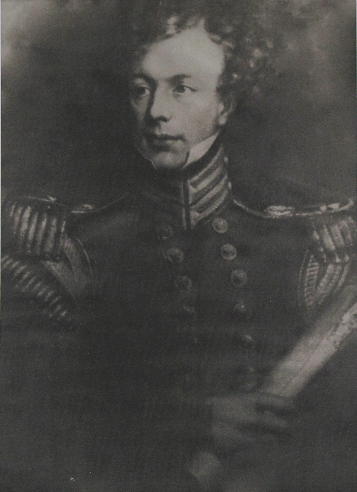
George Maclean, Letitia's husband

Landon began to "[talk] of marrying any one, and of wishing to get away, from England, and from those who had thus misunderstood her". In October 1836, Landon met George Maclean, governor of the Gold Coast (now Ghana), at a dinner party given by Matthew Forster, and the two began a relationship. Maclean moved to Scotland early the following year, to the surprise and distress of Landon and her friends. After much prodding, Maclean returned to England and he and Landon were married shortly thereafter, on 7 June 1838. The marriage was held privately, and Landon spent the first month of it living with friends. Her schoolfriend Emma Roberts wrote of Maclean:

No one could better appreciate than L.E.L. the high and sterling qualities of her lover's character, his philanthropic and unceasing endeavours to improve the condition of the natives of Africa; the noble manner in which he interfered to prevent the horrid waste of human life by the barbarian princes in his neighbourhood; and the chivalric energy with which he strove to put an end to the slave-trade. L.E.L. esteemed Mr Maclean the more, in consequence of his not approaching her with the adulation with which her ear had been accustomed, to satiety; she was gratified by the manly nature of his attachment. Possessing, in her estimation, merits of the highest order, the influence which he gained over her promised, in the opinion of those who were best acquainted with the docility of her temper, and her ready acquiescence with the wishes of those she loved, to ensure lasting happiness.

In early July, the couple sailed for Cape Coast, where they arrived on 16 August 1838. During the short time she had in Africa, Landon continued her work on The Female Portrait Gallery, covering Walter Scott's principal heroines, and completed the first volume of a new novel, Lady Anne Granard, or Keeping Up Appearances. In his 1883 memoir Retrospect of a Long Life, Samuel Carter Hall writes of Landon's marriage and husband in very negative terms. "Her marriage wrecked her life; but before that fatal mistake was made, slander had been busy with her fair fame" (Retrospect, p. 395). Landon had taken "refuge from [slander] . . . in union with a man utterly incapable of appreciating her or making her happy, and [she] went out with him to his government at the Gold Coast -- to die" (ibid.). Her death was "not even -- tragical as such an ending would have been . . . to wither before the pestilential influences that steam up from that wilderness of swamp and jungle" but rather "to die a violent death -- a fearful one" (ibid.).

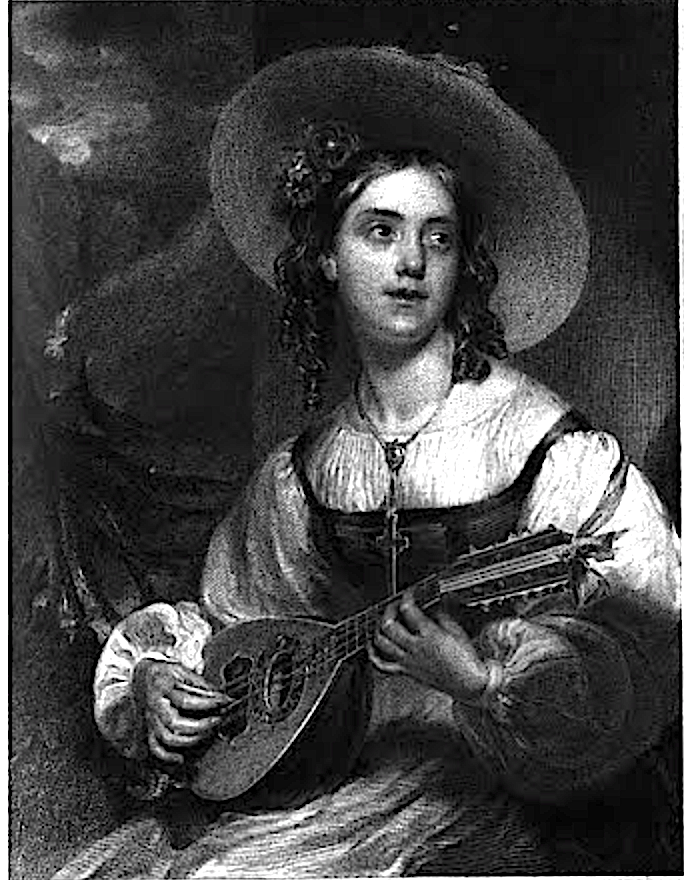
Letitia Landon as The Minstrel of Chamouni, by Pickersgill, 1829–30

Here Hall asserts his belief that Landon was murdered by her husband's common-law wife: "unhappy 'L.E.L.' was murdered I never had a doubt. . . . She landed at Cape Coast Castle in July, 1838, and on the 15th of October she was dead . . . from having accidentally taken a dose of prussic acid. But where was she to have procured that poison? . . . .It was not among the contents of the medicine-chest she took out from England" (ibid., pp. 395–396). Rather, claims Hall, after arriving in Africa, "Maclean left her on board while he went to arrange matters on shore. A negro woman was there, with four or five children -- his children; she had to be sent into the interior to make room for her legitimate successor. It is understood the negress was the daughter of a king . . . [and] from the moment 'L.E.L.' landed her life was at the mercy of her rival; that by her hand she was done to death I am all but certain" (ibid., p. 396).

In fact, Maclean's local mistress had left for Accra long before their arrival, as was confirmed by later interviews with her. His going ashore was most likely to ensure that the accommodation arranged for his new wife was in a healthy condition. The date on her prescription for dilute prussic acid was 1836, probably given when she was first diagnosed as having a critical heart condition.

Most of Hall's accounts are based on the fantastic stories invented by the press following Mrs Maclean's death and have little or no basis in fact.

== Death ==
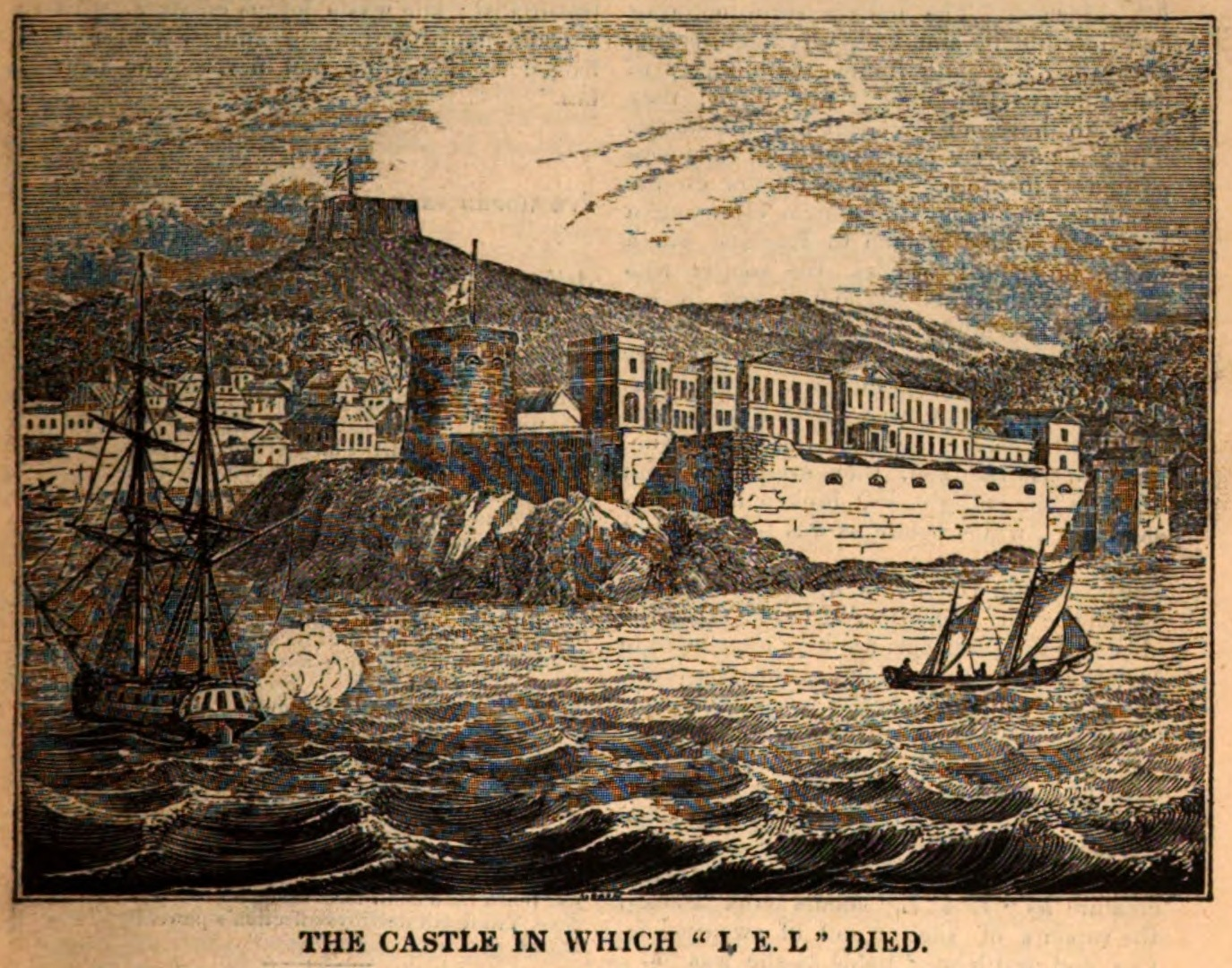
Engraving of Cape Coast Castle, featured in the January 1839 issue of The Mirror of Literature, Amusement, and Instruction

Two months later, on 15 October 1838, Landon was found dead, a bottle of dilute prussic acid in her hand. This was a prescription labelled 'Acid Hydrocianicum Delatum, Pharm. London 1836. Medium Dose Five Minims, being about one third the strength of that in former use, prepared by Scheele's proof'. There is evidence that she showed symptoms of Stokes–Adams syndrome (for one, Mrs Elwood writes that she was subject to spasms, hysterical affections, and deep and instantaneous fainting fits) for which the dilute acid was the standard remedy and, as she told her husband it was so necessary for the preservation of her life, it would appear she had been told that her life was in danger. William Cobbald, the surgeon who attended, reported that 'she was insensible with the pupils of both eyes much dilated', an almost certain indication that a seizure had occurred. No autopsy was carried out (there being no qualified pathologist available) but from the eye-witness accounts it has been argued that Landon suffered a fatal convulsion. Hall notes in Retrospect that Maclean refused Hall's attempts to erect a statue in honour of Landon, and that her funeral services were shrouded in secrecy: "on the evening of her death she was buried in the courtyard of Cape Coast Castle. The grave was dug by torchlight amid a pitiless torrent of rain" (Retrospect, pp. 397–398).

Mrs. Hall and I strove to raise money to place a monument there; but objection was made, and the project was abandoned. Lady Blessington directed a slab to be placed at her expense on the wall. That, also, was objected to. But her husband, for very shame, at last permitted it to be done, and a mural table records that in that African courtyard rests all that is mortal of Letitia Elizabeth Maclean. (Retrospect, p. 398)

This is another example of the disinformation being circulated at the time, see above, and in fact the immediate burial was due to the climate and all the European residents attended with William Topp reading the funeral service. The sudden tropical rainstorm came subsequently during the preparation of the grave. Blanchard states that

It was the immediate wish of Mr. Maclean to place above this grave a suitable memorial, and his desire was expressed in the earliest letter which he sent to England; but we believe that some delay took place in the execution of the order he issued, from the necessity of referring back to the Coast for information as to the intended site of the monument, in order that it might be prepared accordingly. "A handsome marble tablet" is now, it appears, on its way to Cape Coast, to be erected in the castle.

Neither Hall nor Lady Blessington had any part in it, although Lady Blessington was hoping to erect a memorial in Brompton.

== Character sketches ==
Landon's appearance and personality were described by a number of her friends and contemporaries:

Emma Roberts, from her introduction to "The Zenana and other works":

L.E.L. could not be, strictly speaking, called handsome; her eyes being the only good feature in a countenance, which was, however, so animated, and lighted up with such intellectual expression, as to be exceedingly attractive. Gay and piquant, her clear complexion, dark hair, and eyes, rendered her, when in health and spirits, a sparkling brunette. The prettiness of L.E.L., though generally acknowledged, was not talked about; and many persons, on their first introduction, were as pleasingly surprised as the Ettrick Shepherd, who, gazing upon her with great admiration, exclaimed "I did na think ye had been sae bonny." Her figure was slight, and beautifully proportioned, with little hands and feet; and these personal advantages, added to her kind and endearing manners, rendered her exceedingly fascinating.

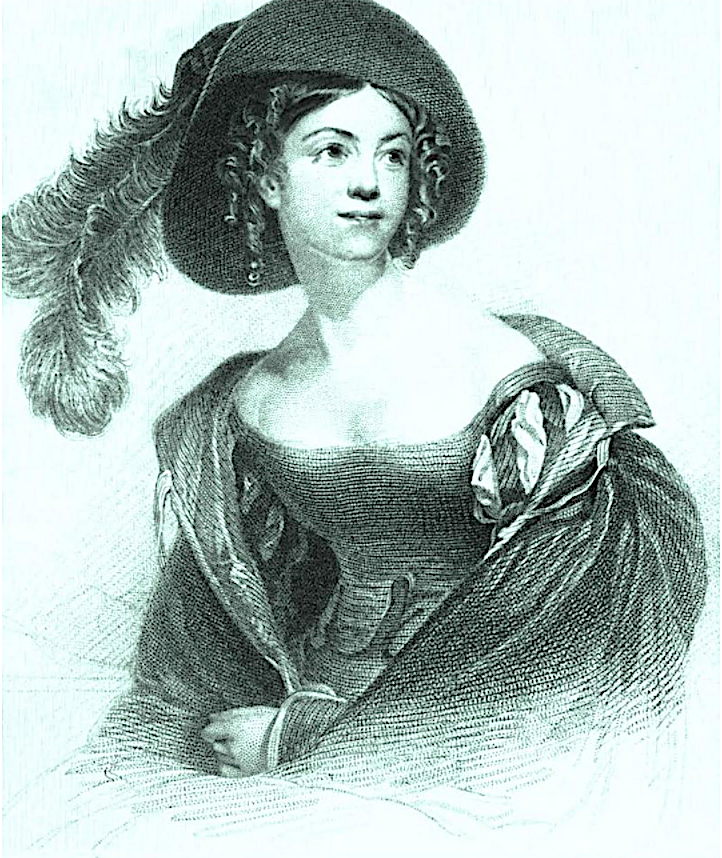
Landon, from the cover of William Jerdan's Autobiography, 1852. Vol. 3; portrait by Pickersgill

William Jerdan, from his autobiography:

In truth, she was the most unselfish of human creatures; and it was quite extraordinary to witness her ceaseless consideration for the feelings of others, even in minute trifles, whilst her own mind was probably troubled and oppressed; a sweet disposition, so perfectly amiable, from Nature's fount, and so unalterable in its manifestations throughout her entire life, that every one who enjoyed her society loved her, and servants, companions, intimates, friends, all united in esteem and affection for the gentle and self-sacrificing being who never exhibited a single trait of egotism, presumption, or unkindliness!

Anna Maria Hall, from The Atlantic Monthly:

Perhaps the greatest magic she exercised was, that, after the first rush of remembrance of all that wonderful young woman had written had subsided, she rendered you completely oblivious of what she had done by the irresistible charm of what she was. You forgot all about her books, – you only felt the intense delight of life with her; she was penetrating and sympathetic, and entered into your feelings so entirely that you wondered how "the little witch" could read you so readily and so rightly, – and if, now and then, you were startled, perhaps dismayed, by her wit, it was but the prick of a diamond arrow. Words and thoughts that she flung hither and thither, without design or intent beyond the amusement of the moment, come to me still with a mingled thrill of pleasure and pain that I cannot describe, and that my most friendly readers, not having known her, could not understand.

Anne Elwood, from her Memoirs of Literary Ladies:

It was her invariable habit to write in her bed-room, – "a homely-looking, almost uncomfortable room, fronting the street, and barely furnished – with a simple white bed, at the foot of which was a small, old, oblong-shaped sort of dressing-table, quite covered with a common worn writing-desk, heaped with papers, while some strewed the ground, the table being too small for aught besides the desk. A little high-backed cane chair, which gave you any idea but that of comfort, and a few books scattered about, completed the author's paraphernalia."

Emma Roberts again:

She not only read, but thoroughly understood, and entered into the merits of every book that came out; while it is merely necessary to refer to her printed works, to calculate the amount of information which she had gathered from preceding authors. The history and literature of all ages and all countries were familiar to her; nor did she acquire any portion of her knowledge in a superficial manner; the extent of her learning, and the depth of her research, manifesting themselves in publications which do not bear her name; her claim to them being only known to friends, who, like myself, had access to her desk, and with whom she knew the secret might be safely trusted.

Her depth of reading is confirmed by Laman Blanchard in his Life, who states:

To those who, looking at the quantity of her published prose and poetry, might wonder how she found time for all these private and unproductive exercises of her pen, it may be desirable to explain, not merely that she wrote, but that she read, with remarkable rapidity. Books, indeed, of the highest character, she would dwell upon with "amorous delay;" but those of ordinary interest, or the nine-day wonders of literature, she would run through in a much shorter space of time than would seem consistent with that thorough understanding of their contents at which she always arrived, or with that accurate observation of the less striking features which she would generally prove to have been bestowed, by reference almost to the very page in which they might be noted. Of some work which she scarcely seemed to have glanced through, she would give an elaborate and succinct account, pointing out the gaps in the plot, or the discrepancies in the characters, and supporting her judgment by all but verbatim quotations.

Other contemporaries also praised Landon's exceptionally high level of intelligence. Fredric Rowton, in The Female Poets of Great Britain, put it thus:

Of Mrs Maclean's genius there can be but one opinion. It is distinguished by very great intellectual power, a highly sensitive and ardent imagination, an intense fervour of passionate emotion, and almost unequalled eloquence and fluency. Of mere art she displays but little. Her style is irregular and careless, and her painting sketchy and rough but there is genius in every line she has written.

(Like many others, Rowton is deceived by the artistry of Landon's projection of herself as the improvisatrice, L. E. L. As Glennis Stephenson writes, few poets have been as artificial as Landon in her "gushing stream of Song". She cites the usage of repetition, mirroring and the embedding of texts amongst the techniques that account for the characteristic intensity of Landon's poetry.)

== Reputation ==
"Do you think of me as I think of you,
My friends, my friends?" She said it from the sea,
The English minstrel in her minstrelsy,
While under brighter skies than erst she knew
Her heart grew dark, and groped as the blind,
To touch, across the waves, friends left behind –
"Do you think of me as I think of you?"

From "L.E.L.'s Last Question," by Elizabeth Barrett Browning (1844)

Among the poets of her own time to recognise and admire Landon were Elizabeth Barrett Browning, who wrote "L.E.L.'s Last Question" in homage; and Christina Rossetti, who published a tribute poem entitled "L.E.L" in her 1866 volume The Prince's Progress and Other Poems.

Landon's reputation, while high in the 19th century, fell during most of the 20th as literary fashions changed: her poetry was perceived as overly simple and sentimental. However, such criticism had already been addressed by Sarah Sheppard in her "Characteristics of the Genius and Writings of L E L" of 1841. Her opening paragraph runs:

Because they whose decision it is, are subjects of the superficial spirit of the age, which leaves them unacquainted with all of which it appoints them judges. Because, either from a dislike of trouble, or inability to pursue the inquiry, these judges never deviate from their own beaten right line to observe how genius acts and is acted upon,—how it is influenced, and what effects it produces on society. Hence the mistaken opinions concerning literary characters one is often compelled to hear from those who, it is to be feared, know little of what they affirm; and of literary works from those who, it is also to be feared, are not competent to decide on their merits. It is indeed strange with what decision people set their seal of condemnation on volumes beyond whose title-pages they have scarcely looked.

In recent years, scholars and critics have increasingly studied her work, beginning with Germaine Greer in the 1970s. Critics such as Isobel Armstrong argue that the supposed simplicity of poetry such as Landon's is deceptive, and that women poets of the 19th century often employed a method of writing which allows for multiple, concurrent levels of meaning. McMullen argues that Landon, although she wrote about what would sell—romance, sensuality, vicariousness, etc., and plays the role of the imitator, actually uses genealogical subversion underneath her words to canonize herself. In mistranslation and retranslation of already quickly canonized Romantic male poets, Landon establishes herself among and even beyond their accomplishments.

Her ideas and the diversity of her poetry engendered a "Landon School", in England and the United States. As for style, William Howitt comments: "This is one singular peculiarity of the poetry of L. E. L.; and her poetry must be confessed to be peculiar. It is entirely her own. It had one prominent and fixed character, and that character belonged solely to itself. The rhythm, the feeling, the style and phraseology of L. E. L.'s poetry, were such, that you could immediately recognize it, though the writer's name was not mentioned."

A tribute in The Literary Gazette, following Landon's death, ran:

To express what we feel on her loss is impossible – and private sorrows of so deep a kind are not for public display: her name will descend to the most distant times, as one of the brightest in the annals of English literature; and whether after ages look at the glowing purity and nature of her first poems, or the more sustained thoughtfulness and vigour of her later works, in prose or in verse, they will cherish her memory as that of one of the most beloved of female authors, the pride and glory of our country while she lived, and the undying delight of succeeding generations. Then, as in our day, young hearts will beat responsive to the thrilling touch of her music; her song of love will find a sacred home in many a fair and ingenuous bosom; her numbers, which breathed of the finest humanities, her playfulness of spirit, and her wonderful delineation of character and society – all – all will be admired, but not lamented as now. She is gone; and, oh, what a light of mind is extinguished: what an amount of friendship and of love has gone down into the grave

== Bibliography ==
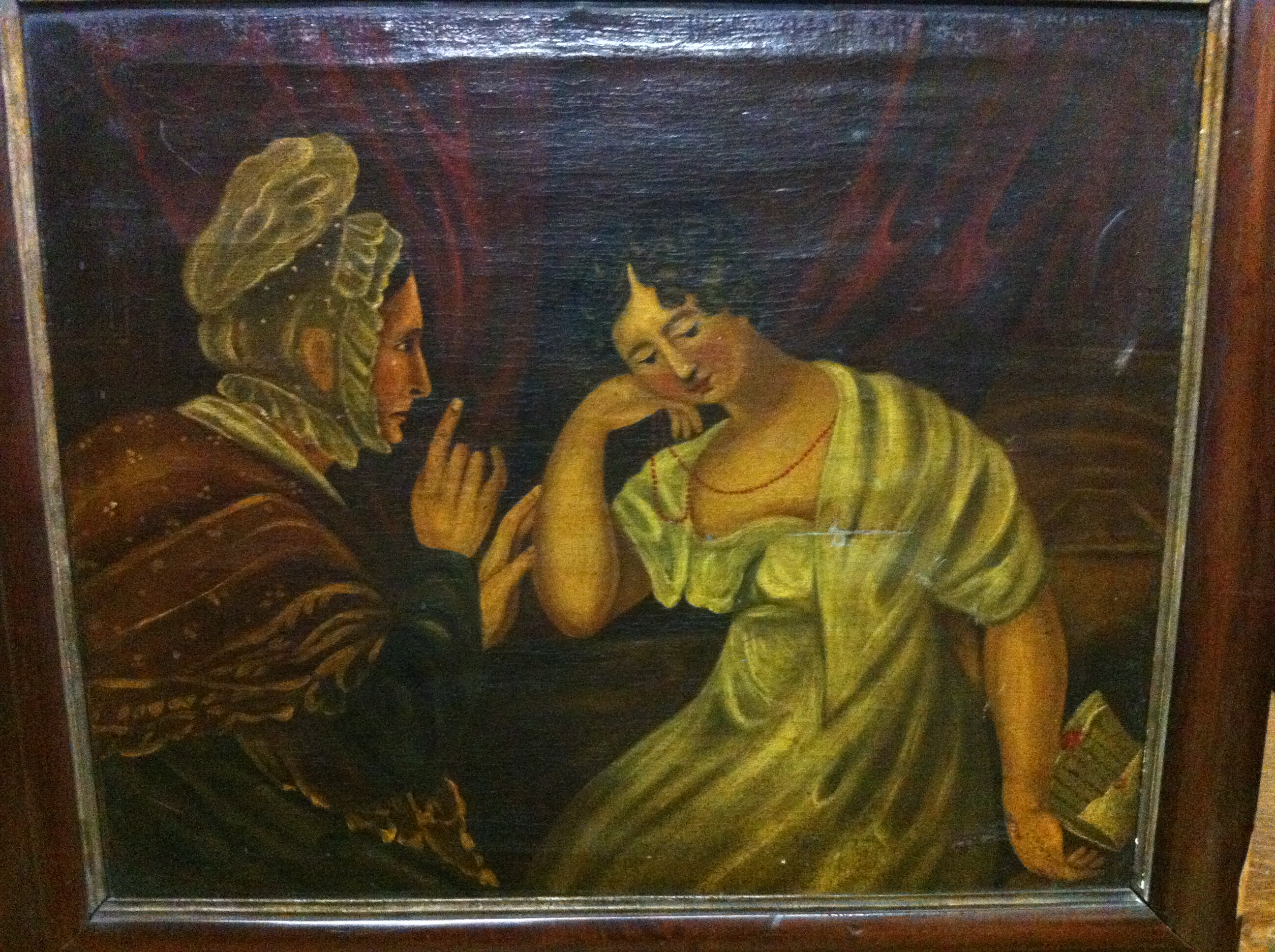
Painting by Henry James Richter, depicting a scene from Sir Walter Scott's The Antiquary (1816), executed between 1816 and 1832. A handwritten poem, The Love Letter, by Letitia Elizabeth Landon, is on a wooden slide at the bottom of the painting.

In addition to the works listed below, Landon was responsible for numerous anonymous reviews, and other articles whose authorship is unlikely now to be established (compare Emma Roberts above). She also assumed the occasional pseudonym: for one, she adopted the name Iole for a period from 1825 to 1827. Two of her Iole poems, The Wreck and The Frozen Ship, were later included in the collection, The Vow of the Peacock. Mary Mitford said that the novels of Catherine Stepney were honed and polished by Landon, including The Heir Presumptive (1835). In the case of Duty and Inclination, she is declared as editor but no originator has been named and the extent of Landon's involvement is unclear.

On her death, Landon left a list of projected works. Besides the novel Lady Anne Granard (first volume completed) and her "tragedy" (Castruccio Catrucani), there were: a critical work in 3 volumes to be called Female Portrait Gallery in Modern Literature for which she says she has collected a vast amount of material (only some portraits based on Walter Scott were produced); a romance called Charlotte Corday for which a plan was sketched plus a "chapter or two"; and a projected 2 volume work on "travels in the country I am about to visit, including the history of the slave trade of which I shall [have] the opportunity of collecting so many curious facts".

- The Fate of Adelaide. A Swiss Romantic tale and other poems. London: John Warren, 1821.
- Fragments in Rhyme. London. The Literary Gazette, 1822–3.
- Poetic Sketches (5 series). London. The Literary Gazette, 1822–4.
- Medallion Wafers. London. The Literary Gazette, 1823.
- Poetical Catalogue of Pictures. London. The Literary Gazette, 1823.
- The Improvisatrice and other poems, with embellishments. London, Hurst Robinson & Co., 1824.
- The Troubadour. Catalogue of pictures and historical sketches. London: Hurst, Robinson and Co., 1825.
- The Golden Violet with its tales of Romance and Chivalry, and other poems. London, Longman, Rees, Orme, Brown and Green, 1827.
- The Venetian Bracelet, The Lost Pleiad, A History of the Lyre and other poems. London, Longman, Rees, Orme, Brown and Green, 1829.
- Romance and Reality. London: Henry Colburn and Richard Bentley. 1831.
- The Easter Gift, A Religious Offering. London: Fisher, Son, & Co, 1832.
- Fisher's Drawing Room Scrap Books. London & Paris: Fisher, Son, & Co., 1832–1839.
- The Book of Beauty; or, Regal Gallery. London: Rees, Orme, Brown, Green, and Longmans, 1833.
- "The Enchantress and Other Tales." The Novelists Magazine 1 (1833): 90–118.
- Metrical versions of the Odes tr. in Corinne, or Italy by Madame de Staël tr. by Isabel Hill. London. Richard Bentley, 1833.
- Francesca Carrara. London: Richard Bentley. 1834.
- Calendar of the London Seasons. The New Monthly Magazine, 1834.
- The Vow of the Peacock and other poems. London: Saunders and Otley, 1835.
- Versions from the German. London. The Literary Gazette, 1835.
- Traits and Trials of Early Life. London. H. Colburn, 1836.
- Subjects for Pictures.. London. The New Monthly Magazine, 1836–8.
- Schloss's (English) Bijou Almanacks, 1836–1839.
- Pictorial Album; or, Cabinet of Paintings, Chapman and Hall, 1837.
- Ethel Churchill; or, The Two Brides. London: Henry Colburn, 1837.
- Flowers of Loveliness. London: Ackerman & Co., 1838.
- Duty and Inclination: A Novel (as editor). London: Henry Colburn, 1838.
- The Female Picture Gallery. London. The New Monthly Magazine, 1838 and Laman Blanchard.
- Castruccio Castrucani, a tragedy in 5 acts. In Laman Blanchard.
- Lady Anne Granard, or Keeping Up Appearances. London, Henry Colburn, 1842 – L.E.L. volume 1, completed by another.
- The Zenana, and minor poems of L.E.L. London: Fisher, Son & Co. 1839. p. 204.
- "The Love Letter, circa 1816"
- The Marriage Vow
- Numerous short stories in various publications.

=== In translation ===
- Die Sängerin. Frankfurt: M. Brönner, 1830. Translation by Clara Himly, together with The Improvisatrice, in English.
- Francesca Carrara. Bremen: A. D. Geisler, 1835. Translation by C. W. Geisler.
- Adele Churchill, oder die zwei Bräute. Leipzig: Kirchner & Schwetschte, 1839. Translation by Fr. L. von Soltau.
- Ethel Churchill, of De twee bruiden. Middelburg: J.C & W. Altorffer, 1844. (Translator unknown).
- Les Album des Salons, 1832 onwards, accompagnées de Poésies Descriptives par L.E.L. Fisher.

== Family ==
In 2000, scholar Cynthia Lawford published birth records implying that Landon had in fact borne children in the 1820s from a secret affair with William Jerdan. Details of Letitia's children by Jerdan (Ella, Fred and Laura) and their descendants can be found in Susan Matoff.
