= Frances Seymour, Duchess of Somerset (born 1699) =

British courtier

Frances Seymour, Countess of Hertford (née Thynne; 10 May 1699 – 7 July 1754), later the Duchess of Somerset, was a British courtier and the wife of Algernon Seymour, Earl of Hertford, who became the 7th Duke of Somerset in 1748. She was also known as a poet, literary patron and woman of letters. Her great-aunt by marriage, Anne Finch, Countess of Winchilsea, influenced her literary development. She was also influenced by the poet Elizabeth Singer (later Rowe), with whom she became acquainted in her youth at Longleat, where she grew up.

== Early life ==
She was the daughter of Henry Thynne (1675–1708) and his wife Grace Strode. Her grandparents were Thomas Thynne, 1st Viscount Weymouth, a distant relation of her future husband and Lady Frances Finch. After her father's death in 1708, Frances and her mother moved to Leweston, the home of her maternal grandfather, Sir George Strode.

== Marriage and issue ==
She married Algernon Seymour, Earl of Hertford later 7th Duke of Somerset, on 5 July 1715, when she was sixteen and he was thirty. The earl and countess had two children:

- George Seymour, Viscount Beauchamp (11 September 1725 – 11 September 1744), who died unmarried.
- Elizabeth Percy, suo jure 2nd Baroness Percy (26 November 1716 – 5 December 1776), who married Sir Hugh Smithson, 4th Baronet, later 2nd Earl of Northumberland by right of his wife and 1st Duke of Northumberland by creation, and had children.

Shortly after their marriage, the couple moved into a house built by her husband's father, Charles Seymour, 6th Duke of Somerset, on the site now occupied by Marlborough College. It had a large formal garden. Frances herself arranged the construction of a "grotto", fashionable during that period, thus becoming an early proponent of the English Landscape Movement.

From 1724 to 1737, Frances was a Lady of the Bedchamber to Queen Caroline, the consort of King George II of Great Britain.

== Literary works and patronage ==
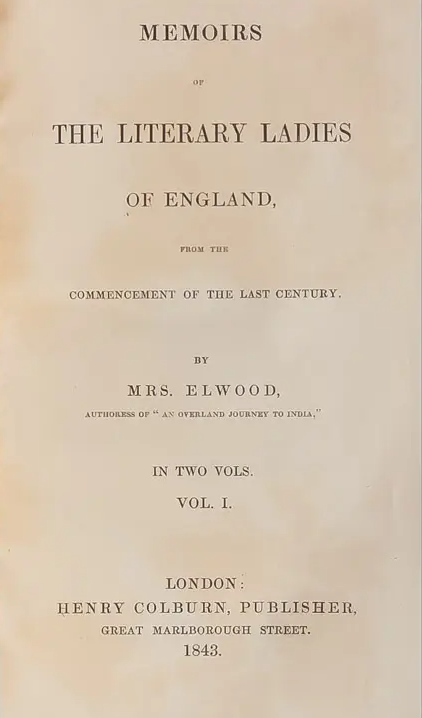
Title page of Memoirs of the literary ladies of England from the commencement of the last century by Anne Elwood, 1843. The third section is a biographical description of Frances Seymour.

In 1725, two short poems by the Countess of Hertford, based on the story of Inkle and Yarico, were published anonymously in A New Miscellany...Written Chiefly by Persons of Quality and Isaac Watts published four short poems by her in 1734, in his Reliquiae juveniles, written under the pen name Eusebia. Her correspondents included Henrietta Knight, Baroness Luxborough, and Henrietta Fermor, Countess of Pomfret. The letters contain such topics as literature, religion, court gossip, family and rural life.

The countess was a literary patron, whose protégés including Isaac Watts, Laurence Eusden, John Dyer, William Shenstone and Stephen Duck, whom she introduced to the queen. Particularly important among these was James Thomson. Samuel Johnson claimed that Thomson, on his first visit to Marlborough, "took more delight in carousing with Lord Hertford and his friends than assisting her ladyship's poetical operations, and therefore never received another summons". Thomson dedicated his 1728 poem, "Spring", to her. The countess even used her influence with Queen Caroline to obtain clemency for Thomson's friend, the poet Richard Savage, who had been convicted of murder.

Frances was an early supporter of Thomas Coram's campaign to provide care for orphans and abandoned children in London. She signed his petition for the establishment of a Foundling Hospital on 26 May 1730, being one of twenty-one 'ladies of quality and distinction' who encouraged male relatives to lend their support to Coram's charitable initiative: a Royal Charter was granted in 1739.

== Death and legacy ==
Elizabeth Singer Rowe's posthumously-published Devout Exercises of the Heart (1737) was dedicated to the countess. According to Horace Walpole, Frances became interested in spiritualism, under Rowe's influence, following the death of her only son, George, who contracted smallpox in Bologna in 1744.

After her husband's death in 1750, she lived her last years at Percy Lodge, where she died on 7 July 1754. She was buried with her son and husband in Westminster Abbey on 20 July.

Frances Seymour was one of the "literary ladies of England" described in Anne Elwood's Memoirs of the literary ladies of England from the commencement of the last century (1843), a collective biography of influential women writers published almost a century after Seymour's death.
