= Mary Collyer =

English translator and novelist

Mary Collyer (née Mitchell) (c. 1716 – 1763) was an English translator and novelist.

== Life ==
Mary, whose maiden name was Mitchell, married Joseph Collyer the elder; their son, Joseph Collyer the younger, was an engraver, and illustrated one edition of his mother's translation Death of Abel.

== Works ==
She is principally known as the translator of Salomon Gessner's 'Death of Abel' (1761). This work passed through numerous editions in England, Scotland, and Ireland.

It became an immediate and enduring bestseller on a par with Pilgrim's Progress and Robinson Crusoe. There were 40 editions and reprints between 1762 and 1800 and reached a total of 70 editions and reprints through 1830 in Britain and North America. The readers of Gessner's version of the biblical story belonged to a poorer and less educated public. While sophisticated readers on the Continent found delight in the Arcadian pantheism of the idyll, the poorer masses of England and North America were attracted to the epic's mixture of sentimental and pious feelings, hymnal pathos and cultural criticism, all of which was intensified in Mary Collyer's translation.

She had previously published in 1750, in two volumes, 'Letters from Felicia to Charlotte,' which recommended her to the notice of Mrs. Montague, Miss Talbot, and Mrs. Carter. The latter in 1761 spoke of her to Mrs. Montague as 'writing for the support of her family,' which, she adds, 'is a laudable employment.'

Mrs. Collyer afterwards translated part of Friedrich Gottlieb Klopstock’s The Messiah but dying in 1763, before it was completed, the remainder was translated and published by her husband about the end of that year in two volumes. The third volume did not appear till 1772, when the taste for this species of poetry, or mixture of poetry and prose, was beginning to decline.

== Bibliography ==
- The Virtuous Orphan (1743), a translation of La vie de Marianne by Marivaux
- Memoirs of the Countess de Bressol … from the French (2 vols., 1743)
- Felicia to Charlotte: being letters from a young lady in the country, to her friend in town. Containing a series of most interesting Events, interspersed with Moral Reflections; chiefly tending to prove, that the Seeds of Virtue are implanted in the Mind of Every Reasonable Being. (1744–9, in 2 vols). Collyer's own novel
- The Christmas Box (1748–9)
- Death of Abel (1761), a translation of Salomon Gessner's Der Tod Abels (1758)
- The Messiah (2 vols., 1763), a translation of Friedrich Gottlieb Klopstock's Der Messias. Completed and published by Collyer's husband Joseph.
