= Der Messias (Klopstock) =

18th-century German epic poem by Friedrich Gottlieb Klopstock

Der Messias ("The Messiah") is an epic poem published from 1748 to 1773 by German poet Friedrich Gottlieb Klopstock.

== Publication ==
The poem consists of 19,458 dactylic hexameters, as compared with the 15,693 of Homer's Iliad. At Schulpforta, the classical school Klopstock attended 1739–1745, the plan for the poem was formulated. The project reflected the influence of Johann Jakob Bodmer's translation of John Milton's Paradise Lost, which Klopstock had read at the school. After developing his plan, Klopstock wrote a prose version of the first three cantos. After going to Leipzig in 1747, he recast the prose into dactylic hexameters. In 1748, this verse for the first three cantos appeared anonymously in the Bremer Beiträge ("Bremen Contributions"). The next two cantos appeared in 1750, and the next five appeared in 1755. Ten more cantos appeared substantially later – five in 1768 and five in 1773.

== Reception ==
When the first three cantos appeared, it took the public a year to get accustomed to the novelty of the form and content, after which the poem's success was unprecedented; its readers awaited with impatience the next cantos. The poem became regarded in some circles as equal to the epics of Dante and Milton, especially by women and religious people.

In using hexameters for his verse, Klopstock had abandoned the traditional Alexandrines. This loosed a storm of criticism on his head from the school of Johann Christoph Gottsched, who ridiculed what he called Klopstock's "seraphic spirit of fanaticism", his strictures on Gottsched's dogmatism, his effeminate and morbid tenderness, and his religious sentimentality. These criticisms were later confirmed by Lessing, although in a milder and more dignified spirit. On the other hand, the school of Bodmer applauded. It has been said that the work of no German poet before Richard Wagner aroused such controversy. Goethe's Autobiography tells us that his father banished the book from the house because of its blank verse.

The fame of the work rests on the first ten cantos. By the time the last ten cantos came out, interest in the work had ebbed. A flood of epic imitations on various biblical subjects attested to his contemporary influence, and all the younger poets of his day learned from Klopstock, but the 19th century admired him from an ever-increasing distance.

The poem was the means of introducing Klopstock to Meta Moller, who became his wife. She had come across the poem in the curl papers on a friend's dressing table, the papers having been cut from the poem, and wanted to meet Klopstock. A mutual friend introduced them in 1751.

== Theme and style ==
The theme of the poem is the redemption of mankind, and the poem starts with Jesus's entry into Jerusalem on Palm Sunday. Klopstock's work shows he learned much from Milton. However, instead of strong contrasts, going from darkness to light, from misery to bliss, Klopstock attempts to portray a mental state of continuous, dazzling brilliancy. Instead of an alternation of clashes, there is contemplation. Notable descriptions are those of hell, the council of the devils, their punishment through transformation, the trips through the universe made by angels and devils, and the vision of the last judgment.

== Critical readings ==
- Wilhelm Scherer, Geschichte der deutschen Literatur (12th ed.. 1910)
- Franz Muncker, Klopstocks Leben (Chap. 4, Stuttgart 1893)
- G. E. Lessing, "Ueber das Heldengedicht: Der Messias," XV from Briefe (1753)

== Editions ==
- A prose English translation was produced by Mrs. Mary Collyer and completed by her husband Joseph Collyer after her death 1763.
- A translation into English blank verse was made by Solomon Halling and published in 1810.
- An excellent English verse translation was completed by G. H. C. Egestorff in 1826, and is available online via Google Books in two parts: volumes 1&2 | volumes 3&4.
