= Grizel Baillie, Lady Murray =

Scottish memoir writer 1692–1759

Grizel Baillie Lady Murray of Stanhope
- Born: Grizel Baillie; 25 October 1692; Jerviswoode, Lanark, Scotland
- Died: 6 June 1759 (aged 66)
- Occupation: memoirist
- Spouse: Sir Alexander Murray, 3rd Baronet
- Parent(s): Lady Grizel Baillie; George Baillie
- Writing career
- Language: English
- Subject: biography
- Notable works: Memoirs of the lives and characters of the Right Honourable George Baillie of Jerviswood, and of Lady Grisell Baillie

Grisell Baillie Lady Murray
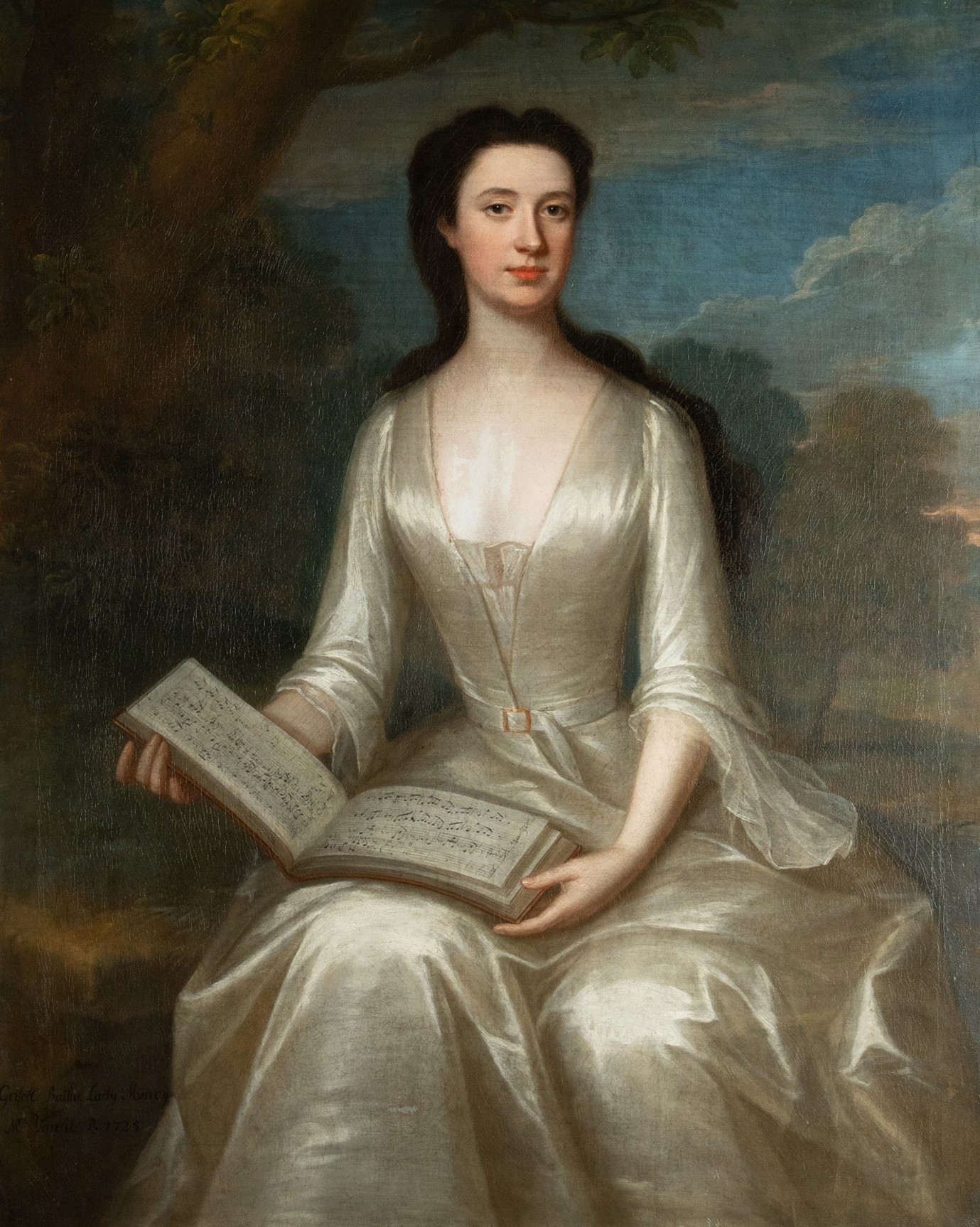
- Inscription (but not signed and dated): Grisell Baillie Lady Murray // Mrs Varelst P. 1725
- Artist: Adriana Verelst
- Year: 1725
- Medium: Oil on canvas
- Subject: Grizel Baillie, Lady Murray (25 Oct 1692-6 June 1759), later Lady Murray
- Location: Music Room, Mellerstain House, Gordon, TD3 6LG

Grizel Baillie (later Lady Murray of Stanhope; 1692–1759) was a Scottish memoirist whose work is important to social historians and scholars of life writing.

== Life ==
Baillie was the elder daughter of Lady Grisell Baillie (née Hume; 1665–1746), gentlewoman and songwriter, and George Baillie (1697–1732), politician. She had two siblings: a younger sister, Rachel (1696–1773), and a brother, Robert (1694-1696), who died in infancy. Her grandparents on both sides were Covenanters implicated in the Rye House Plot; her parents were acquainted from youth and by all accounts had "a loving companionate marriage". The sisters, known as "Grisie" and "Rachie" within the family, were well-educated by a variety of tutors in "reading, writing, arithmetic, geography and French" as well as various feminine accomplishments such as singing, music, and dancing.

On 16 August 1710 at the age of seventeen, Baillie married Alexander Murray, the Member of Parliament (MP) for Peeblesshire from 1710 to 1713. Although it was initially a love match, the union rapidly deteriorated due to Murray's "dark, moody, and ferocious temper", and after only a few months of marriage, Murray agreed to leave the Baillie home. There was an attempt at reconciliation in 1711–12 but the couple were formally separated by 1714. As late as 1735, however, after learning of George Baillie's death, Murray reestablished contact with the family, claimed defamation of character, and sought financial compensation as well as the erasure of the deed of separation. Of the marriage, Baillie later wrote, “it turned out to be the most unfortunate choice I could have made, which gave [her father] a great deal of uneasiness and trouble”. Legal separations in Scotland at this time meant that neither party could remarry, and Baillie lived with her parents for the rest of their lives, and afterwards with her sister and her sister's family.

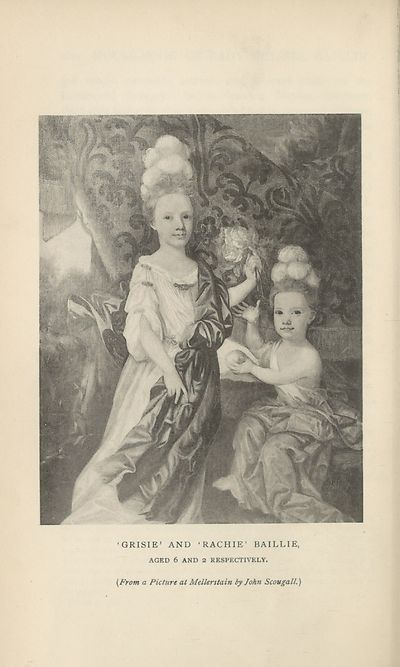
"Grisie" and "Rachie" Baillie at Mellerstain, from a picture by John Scougall, c. 1698. Repro. The Household Book of Lady Grisell Baillie. NLS

== Writing ==
Baillie's writing was confined within the privacy of her family circle. She had charge of extensive manuscripts belonging to her mother, a prolific songwriter and keeper of voluminous account books. A scholarly edition of these latter was published in 1911.

Baillie wrote biographical portraits of each of her parents without intending to have them printed: "Plain Facts Relating to My Father's Character, of which I could give many more" (1739) and "Facts Relating to my Mother's Life and Character" (1749), "a longer, more connected, and more emotional account of her mother". Excerpts were published, however, in 1809, as an appendix to George Rose's Observations on the Historical Work of the Right Honorable Charles James Fox under the title, "Lady Murray's Narrative". The work was later republished by Thomas Thomson in its entirety, in 1822.

== Critical reception ==
She travelled in literary circles — John Gay refers to her as "the sweet-tongu'd Murray" in his poem "Mr. Pope's Welcome from Greece" and she was a friend of Mary Hervey, and also of Lady Mary Wortley Montagu for some time until Montagu offended her with an ill-judged satire — yet her own writing was private until half a century after her death. She is included in Anne Elwood's Memoirs of the literary ladies of England from the commencement of the last century (1843), a collective biography of literary women from the early eighteenth century onward.

== Etexts ==
- Murray, Grisell. Memoirs of the lives and characters of the Right Honourable George Baillie of Jerviswood, and of Lady Grisell Baillie. Edinburgh: Printed by John Pillans, 1822. (Etext, Internet Archive)

== Notes and references ==
=== References ===
- Brown, Susan, Patricia Clements, and Isobel Grundy, eds. "Grisell Murray." Orlando: Women’s Writing in the British Isles from the Beginnings to the Present. Cambridge University Press. n.d. 22 Mar. 2013. Accessed 23 Sept. 2023.
- Elwwod, Anne. Memoirs of the literary ladies of England from the commencement of the last century. London: H. Colburn, 1843. (Vol. I, Vol. II, Google)
- MacDonald, Jasmine. "The Baillies of Mellerstain: The Household Economy in an Eighteenth-Century Elite Household". Thesis, Master of Arts, University of Saskatchewan, 2010. (PDF)
