= Jane Roberts (author) =

English author (1792–1871)

Jane Roberts (1792 – 1871) was an English author active in the 1830s, best known for her account of a two-year voyage to Van Diemen's Land (Tasmania) during which she visited and described the Swan River Colony. She had a considerable number of literary and social acquaintances including Augusta Leigh and Lady Cork. During her own lifetime she was sometimes confused with Emma Roberts, with whom she corresponded, though the two women were not related. They were about the same age and they were both referred to as Miss Roberts. Unusually for single women of that era they had also both travelled separately to Calcutta within two or three years of each other.

== Early life ==
Jane Roberts was born in Hythe, Kent, in 1792, the only surviving daughter of John and Martha Roberts (formerly Martha Bedson). Her father was paymaster of 10th Dragoons and later barrack master at Dungeness Fort in Kent, where he died in 1816. Her mother died at Cheyne Walk in Chelsea in 1823, and was buried at Mortlake in Surrey, where Jane erected a tombstone to her memory. Two of Jane's brothers emigrated to Australia, one of whom was Peter Roberts (1786-1860), Deputy Assistant Commissary General in New South Wales. Jane intended to join her brothers in 1829, but for family reasons she immediately returned to England, where she wrote an account of her voyage.

== Career ==
Jane Roberts' first book, "Two Years at Sea" was published by Richard Bentley in 1834 and dedicated to the Earl of Munster, a connection that stemmed from her father's links with the 10th Dragoons. Her first novel, Lowenstein, King of the Forests was published in 1836 by Whittaker & Co, but after this initial burst of activity she gradually faded from the literary mainstream. Her journal records that she maintained extensive connections with literary-minded people, amongst whom were Lady Bradford and Lady Dungannon. Lodging in London, she was able to support herself partly through her writing but probably far more by the patronage of Lady Cork, and by means of a pension that was administered by her brother John Roberts (1790–1868), First Clerk and Head of the Promotions Department of the War Office. The last entry in her journal is dated 1851, and in 1861 she was lodging in the Marylebone Road in London. She died in 1871.

Jane Roberts also wrote a quantity of poetry, some of which was published anonymously, and a number of unpublished poems and draft plots for novels survive in her notebooks. She was the inventor of The Royal Historical Game of Cards, mentioned in her journal and published by Robert Hardwicke in 1835.

== Works ==
- Two Years at Sea (1834)
- The Royal Historical Game of Cards (1835)
- Lowenstein King of the Forests (1836)
- The Court Favourite (1840)
