= Henriette Wienecke =

Norwegian-Danish composer (1819–1907)

Sigrid Ingeborg Henriette Wienecke (née Stadfeldt; March 13, 1819 – April 18, 1907) was a Norwegian-Danish composer who produced over 140 psalms and musical pieces.

== Biography ==
Wienecke was born in Frederikshald, Norway to Asgeir Johnson Stadfeldt (1786-1831) and Anna Bruun Tordenskjold (1781-1848).

Wienecke moved to Oslo with her mother after the death of her father, and in 1834 married her singing teacher, Friedrich Ferdinand Wienecke (1809-1877), who was employed by the Christiania Theater; the couple had one daughter, who died as an infant. Wienecke wanted to become an actress, but her husband did not consider it suitable for a person of her social class. She did, however, take piano lessons. The couple moved, with her mother, to Copenhagen in 1839, where both Friedrich and Henriette unsuccessfully tried to get jobs at the Royal Theater. In 1840, she moved permanently to Copenhagen with her mother and husband.

In 1848, after having lost her mother, she retired from social life, had a religious conversion, and started to compose psalms, and songs based on texts by Hans Christian Andersen and others. She and her husband became followers of N.F.S. Grundtvig and Nicolai Gottlieb Blædel (1816-1879), and hosted bible studies and religious concerts in their home.

She died at Gentofte, Denmark.

== Works ==
=== Theatre ===
- Fader Vor (Our Father; text by Friedrich Gottlieb Klopstock; music by Wienecke)

== Vocal ==
- Aftensang (Evening Song)
- Arne's Song (text by Bjørnstjerne Bjørnson; music by Wienecke)
- Compositions for Voice and Piano (2 Volumes containing134 songs)
- Dannebrogslied (Flag of Denmark Song)
- De Tvende Draaker (The Second Dragon)
- God, My God
- Gud Tilgive Dig (God Forgive You)
- Hvidtfeld
- Koenig Christian
- Maria Magdalene (text by H. H. Nyegaard; music by Wienecke)
- Min Lille Fugl (My Little Bird)
- Se Jeg Vil Sende Min Engel (I Will Send My Angel)
- Sorg (Grief; text by P. E. Benzon; music by Wienecke)
- To Psalmer (Psalms; arranged for 4 voices and for voice and piano)
- Tre Psalmer (Three Hymns)
- Vinterfuglen (Winter Bird)
