= James Heath (engraver) =

British engraver (1757–1834)

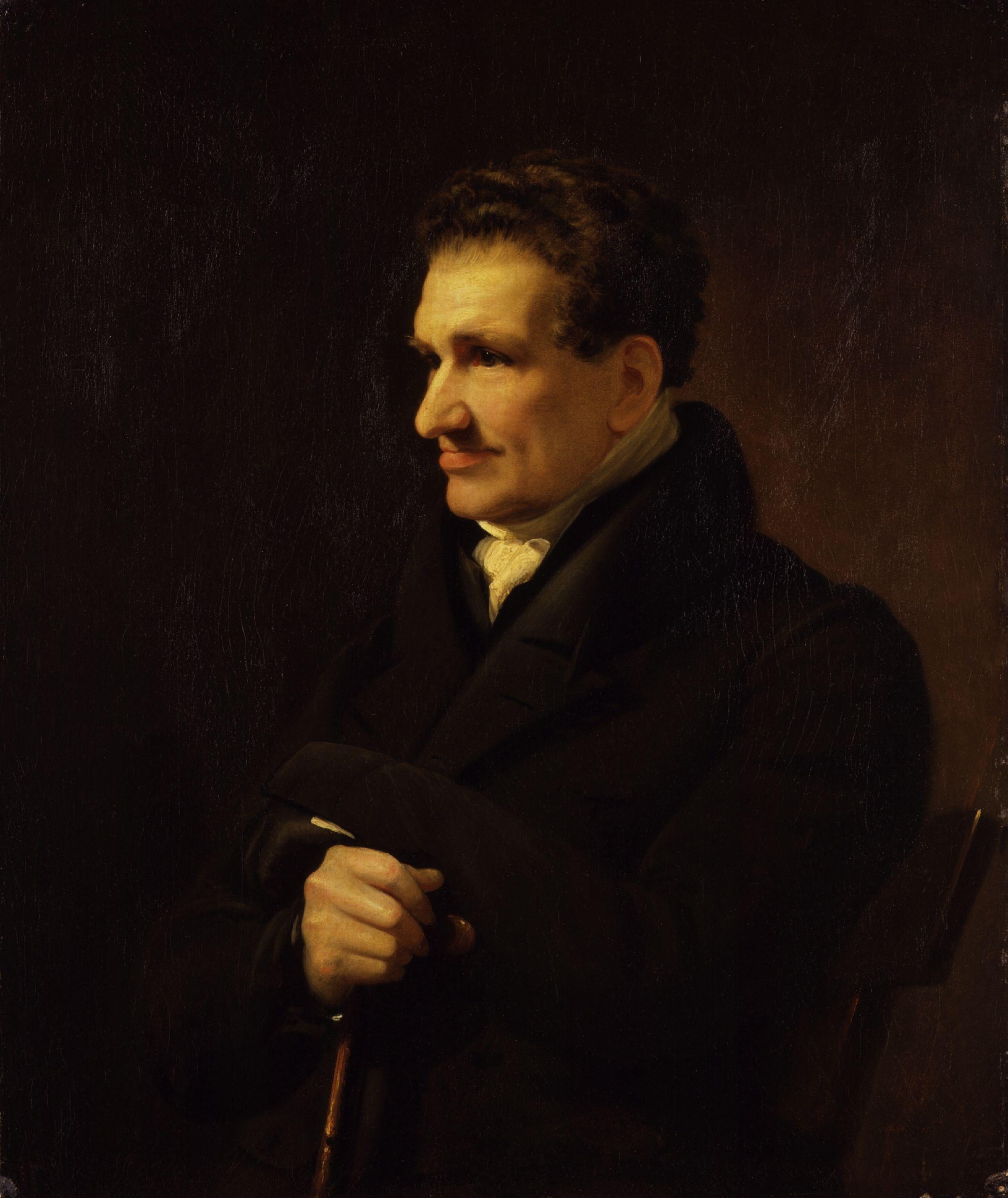
- Portrait of James Heath by James Lonsdale, 1830
- Born: James Heath; 19 April 1757; Newgate, London, England
- Died: 15 November 1834 (aged 77); London, England
- Known for: Engraver

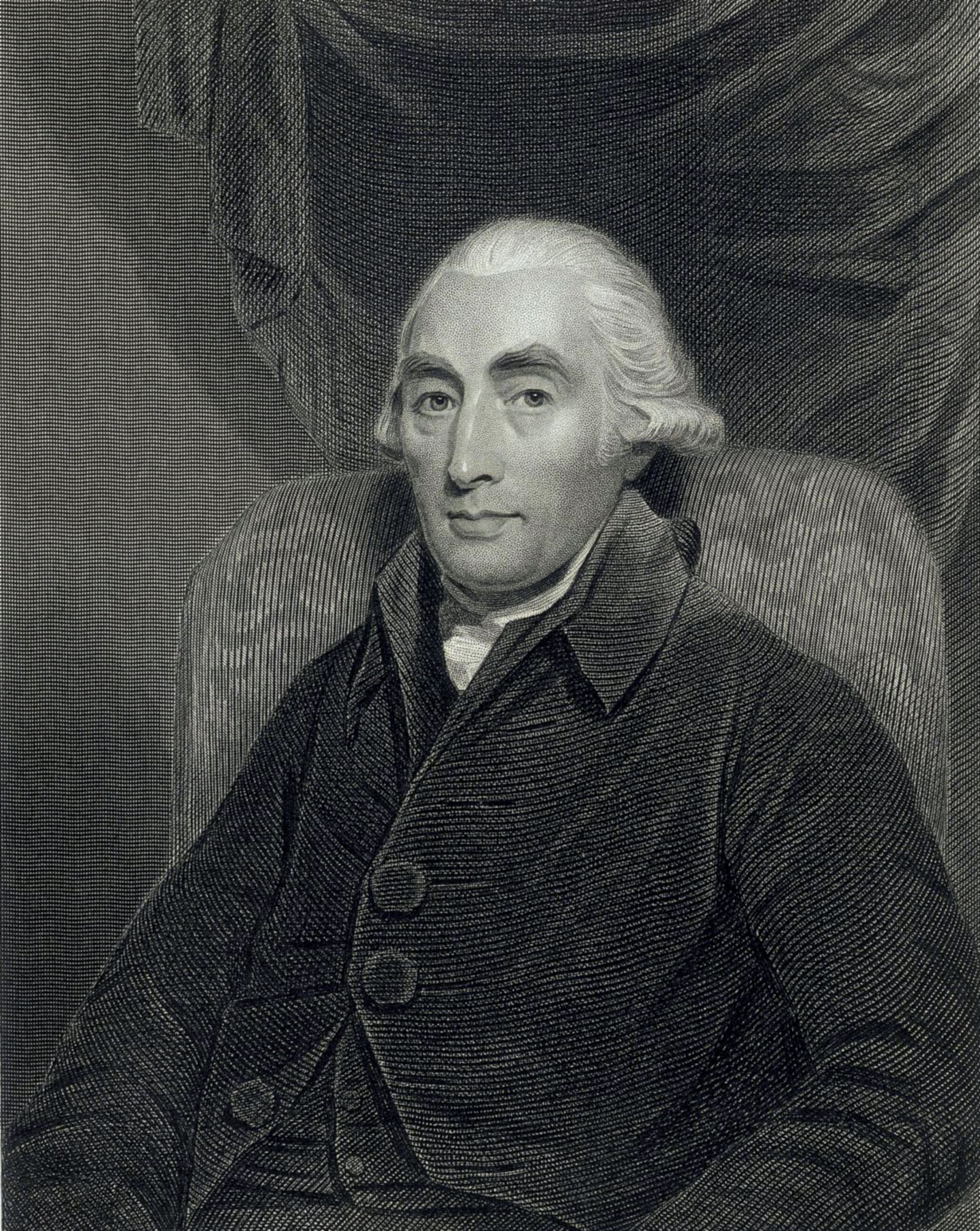
Joseph Black (stipple engraving after Henry Raeburn, 1800)

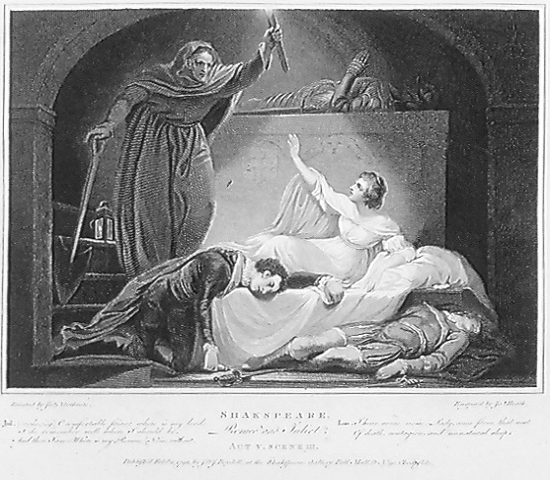
Scene from "Romeo and Juliet (1792, engraving after James Northcote)

James Heath ARA (19 April 1757 – 15 November 1834) was a British engraver. He enjoyed the patronage of George III and successive monarchs.

== Life and work ==
Heath was born in Newgate, London, the son of George Heath, a bookbinder (d. 1773). He was articled to the engraver Joseph Collyer the younger, an exacting master who required steady application from his pupil - as a result, Heath acquired a great mechanical skill in his art. His earliest engravings were of portraits in the collected edition of Horace Walpole's works. He was subsequently employed to engrave Thomas Stothard's designs for Harrison's The Novelist's Magazine and Bell's Poets of Great Britain, and the taste and dexterity with which he rendered these small illustrations brought this style of illustration into great popularity. He made many engravings after artists such as Stothard, Smirke, and others, and these were to be found in publications such as: Sharpe's British Classics, the Lady's Poetical Magazine, Forster's Arabian Nights, Glover's Leonidas, and many similar editions of popular works.

He engraved some of the plates for John Boydell's Shakespeare and also, in 1802, published his own six-volume illustrated edition of Shakespeare. In 1780, he exhibited three engravings at the exhibition of the Society of Artists. In 1791, he was elected an associate engraver of the Royal Academy, and, in 1794, was appointed historical engraver to George III, continuing in that post under successive sovereigns until his death. He engraved some large plates, notably "The Dead Soldier" (after Joseph Wright of Derby), "The Death of Nelson" (after Benjamin West), "The Riots in Broad Street. 1780" (after Francis Wheatley), "The Death of Major Pierson" (after J S Copley), "Titian's daughter" (after Titian),"The Holy Family" and "The Good Shepherd" (after Murillo), "The Holy family" (after Raphael) etc.

He worked first in stipple and afterwards in line, sometimes in conjunction with others, keeping a large number of pupils working under his direction. He re-engraved the existing set of Hogarth's plates, and completed the engravings of Stothard's "Canterbury Pilgrims", left unfinished by Schiavonetti at his death. He also engraved numerous portraits.

Heath amassed a considerable fortune, but lost much property by a fire in 1789. About 1823 he retired from his profession and his stock of proofs and other engravings was dispersed by auction in that year. Around 1777, he married Elizabeth Thomas (daughter of the Rev. Dr. Thomas, a Welsh clergyman), and they had one son, George Heath, who became a Serjeant-at-law. His illegitimate son was Charles Heath (1785–1848), also a notable engraver.

=== Death ===
James Heath died in Great Coram Street, London, on 15 July 1834. His portraits were painted by Joshua Reynolds, James Lonsdale (1777–1839), William Behnes, L. F. Abbott, and Thomas George (fl. 1829–1838); the latter three were engraved. A small oval portrait was also engraved for the Monthly Mirror in 1796. In 1834, he exhibited "Children playing with a Donkey" at the Royal Academy, but it was not stated to have been on engraving.

== Bibliography ==
- John Heath. The Heath Family Engravers. (In three volumes. Scolar Press, 1993. Quacks, 1999).
