= Maria Elisabeth Vogel =

German painter

Maria Elisabeth Vogel (née Timmermann; July 4, 1746 – April 13, 1810) was a German painter from the Holy Roman Empire. She is best known for her 1792 effigy of Friedrich Gottlieb Klopstock. Many of her works are a part of the collections of the Museum for Hamburg History today. She was one of the first four women to be accepted as honorary members of the Kunsthochschule Kassel in 1780. She was also known by her married name of Maria Elisabeth de Boor.
