= Joseph Collyer =

British engraver (1748–1827)

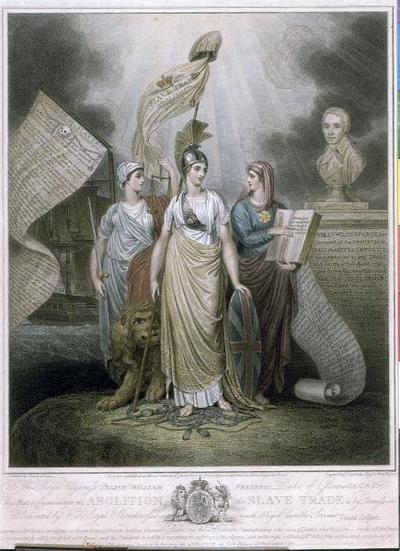
Abolition of the Slave Trade in 1807 (1808, engraving after Henry Moses)

Joseph Collyer ARA (14 September 1748 – 24 December 1827), also called Joseph Collyer the Younger, was a British engraver. He was an associate of the Royal Academy and portrait engraver to the British Queen Consort, Queen Charlotte.

== Life and work ==
Collyer, the younger, was born in London, the son of Joseph Collyer (d. 1776), editor and translator, and Mary Collyer (née Mitchell, d. 1763), translator and novelist. He studied for a short time under the engraver Anthony Walker, and applied himself to book illustrations with success. He attracted the notice of John Boydell and was employed to make an engraving after David Teniers. In 1761 he was awarded a premium from the Society of Arts; about nine years later he entered the Royal Academy, where he exhibited for the first time in 1770. He was admitted as a student in 1771. Sir Joshua Reynolds allowed Collyer to reproduce two of his paintings, "Venus" and "Una", as chalk engravings (a type of stipple engraving). He engraved some large plates including, 'The Volunteers of Ireland' after Francis Wheatley, published in 1784. In 1786 he was elected an associate engraver of the Royal Academy, and appointed portrait engraver to Queen Charlotte. In 1815 he was master of the Stationers' Company.

Among his engraved portraits may be mentioned those of the Princess of Wales and the Princess Charlotte (1799); George, Duke of Montagu (1793); Sir Charles Grey, K.B. (1797); Sir Joseph Banks (1789); Qian Long, emperor of China (1796); Thomas Newton, Bishop of Bristol; Mary Palmer (1785);

William Whitehead (1787); Paul Whitehead (1776); and Sir William Young. Collyer also engraved the illustrations to Hervey's 'Naval History,' besides several plates after Rooker. He last exhibited at the Royal Academy in 1822, and died on 24 December 1827.

Engraver James Heath was one of his apprentices.
