= Elizabeth Smith (translator) =

English translator, linguist, and Biblical scholar

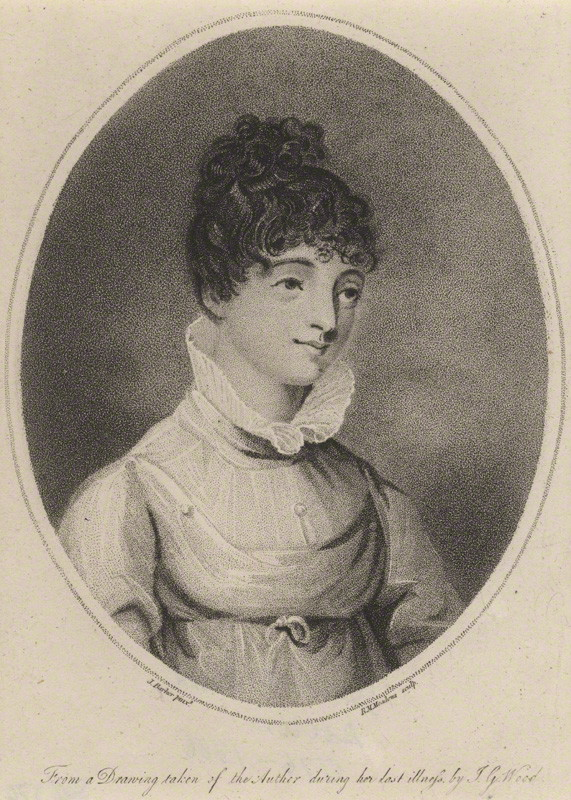
Elizabeth Smith

Elizabeth Smith (December 1776 – 7 August 1806) was an English translator, linguist, and Biblical and Oriental scholar.

== Early life and education ==
Smith, the second child and eldest daughter of George and Juliet Smith, was born at Burn Hall, a family property near Durham, in December 1776. A clever and bookish child, she was never at school, and was chiefly educated by her mother. At the beginning of 1782 the family moved to Suffolk, to be near a blind relative, who died in 1784. They moved back to Burn Hall till June 1785, when the father, who was partner in a West Country banking firm, took Piercefield Park, near Chepstow, Monmouthshire. By this time Elizabeth had made good progress in music. For three years from the spring of 1786 she was under a governess, who taught her French and a little Italian. All her other linguistic attainments were of her own acquiring. The family had a good library, and she read with avidity, especially the poets. Devoting some hours before breakfast each morning to study, she improved her Italian, and by 1793 could read Spanish without difficulty.

The declaration of war by France in February 1793 produced a financial crisis which proved fatal to several banks, her father's among the number. In March he gave up Piercefield, and in 1794 took a commission in the army, serving for some years in Ireland. Elizabeth spent seven or eight months at the fashionable spa resort Bath, where her friend Mary Hunt encouraged her to study German and botany. At the end of the year she began Arabic and Persian. She began Latin in November 1794, and by February 1795 had "read Cæsar's Commentaries, Livy, and some volumes of Cicero", and was "very impatient to begin Virgil". After she and her mother joined her father at Sligo, she picked up an Irish grammar at Armagh, and at once began to study it. She must have begun Hebrew soon after returning to Bath in October 1796, as she was translating from the Book of Genesis in 1797. In 1799 she found at Shirley a Syriac New Testament, printed in Hebrew characters, and could "read it very well". Buxtorf's Florilegium she carried always in her pocket. In the summer of 1799 the family settled at Ballitore, County Kildare, moving in May 1801 to Coniston (then in Lancashire, now in Cumbria), where Smith spent the rest of her life. In May 1802 she met the writer Elizabeth Hamilton (1758–1816), who thought that "with a little of the Scotch frankness … she would be one of the most perfect of human beings."

== Death ==
After a year's decline of health, Smith died at Coniston on 7 August 1806. She was buried at Hawkshead, where there is a tablet to her memory in the parish church.

== Works ==
Smith's powers of memory and of divination must have been remarkable, for she rarely consulted a dictionary. Translation from Hebrew was her "Sunday work". Along with her intellectual accomplishments, Smith also excelled at cooking, needlework, and equestrianism. Among her philological collections were lists of words in Welsh, Chinese, and African dialects, with some Icelandic studies.

The following were published from her papers:

- Fragments, in Prose and Verse … with some Account of her Life, by H. M. Bowdler, &c. 1808, 8vo (portrait); contains translations of Jonah ii. and Habakkuk iii.
- Memoirs of Frederick and Margaret Klopstock, translated from the German, &c. 1808, 8vo (from materials supplied by Dr. Mumssen of Altona); in many issues this is treated as a second volume of No. 1.
- The Book of Job, translated, &c., 1810, 8vo, edited by Francis Randolph, himself no great hebraist, on the recommendation of Archbishop William Magee, who read the manuscript, and thought it the best version of Job he knew; dedicated (18 January 1810) to Thomas Burgess, by then Bishop of St David's
- A Vocabulary, Hebrew, Arabic, and Persian, &c. 1814, 8vo; edited, with Praxis on the Arabic Alphabet, by John Frederick Usko, vicar of Orsett, Essex, who notes that she was the first to systematically collate the three languages; prefixed is a letter (1 July 1814) by Bishop Burgess.

Selections from the author's didactic writings also appeared in The Lady's Monitor (1828).

Smith was the first person to introduce the work of Meta Klopstock to readers in English, through her 1808 translation.
