= Meta Klopstock =

German writer (1728–1758)

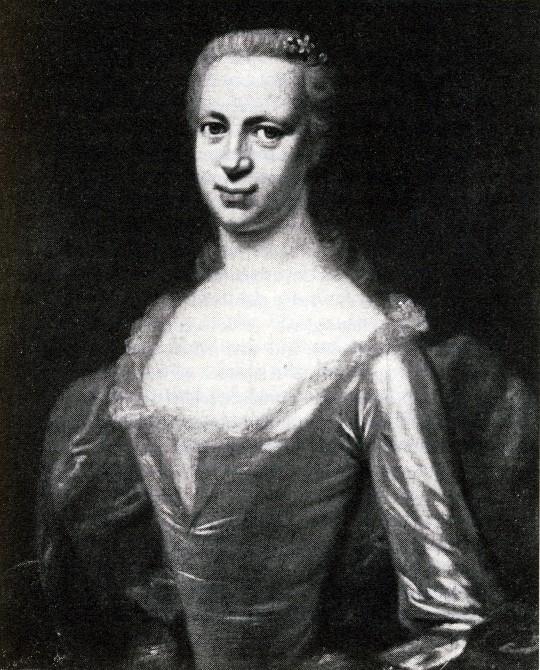
- Portrait of Meta Klopstock, c. 1755, by Dominicus van der Smissen
- Born: Margareta Moller; March 16, 1728; Hamburg
- Died: November 28, 1758 (aged 30); Hamburg
- Occupation: writer
- Known for: letters

Margareta Klopstock or Meta Klopstock (German: [ˈklɔpʃtɔk]; 16 March 1728 – 28 November 1758) was a German writer. Her letters, particularly those to Samuel Richardson, and the story of her life were popular in the eighteenth and nineteenth centuries. She was married to the poet Friedrich Gottlieb Klopstock.

== Life ==
Margareta Moller was born in 1728 into a wealthy merchant family in Hamburg. She became interested in Klopstock through his poem The Messiah. One of her friends had cut up the poem to use as curl papers, and Meta saw them on her friend's dressing table. A mutual friend introduced Meta and Klopstock in 1751. Klopstock wrote "I found her, in every sense of the word, so lovely, so amiable, so full of attractions".

Meta was able to make her own decisions about marriage, as her father had left her enough money to be independent. Her mother at first objected to her marrying Klopstock because of his lack of wealth, but was persuaded. They married in 1754, when Meta was 26. Her criticism of Klopstock's writing was valuable to him. Klopstock addressed her as "Cidli" in his poems to her.

During Meta Klopstock's first pregnancy in 1758 at the age of thirty, she considered that she might die during childbirth. She had been present for her sister's difficult labour and the death of her baby. Meta and her baby both died. She was reported to have said on her deathbed "'how should I now feel, if I had not employed the whole nine months in preparing for my death!'". Meta and the baby were buried at the Christianskirche (Ottensen), in Ottensen, Altona.

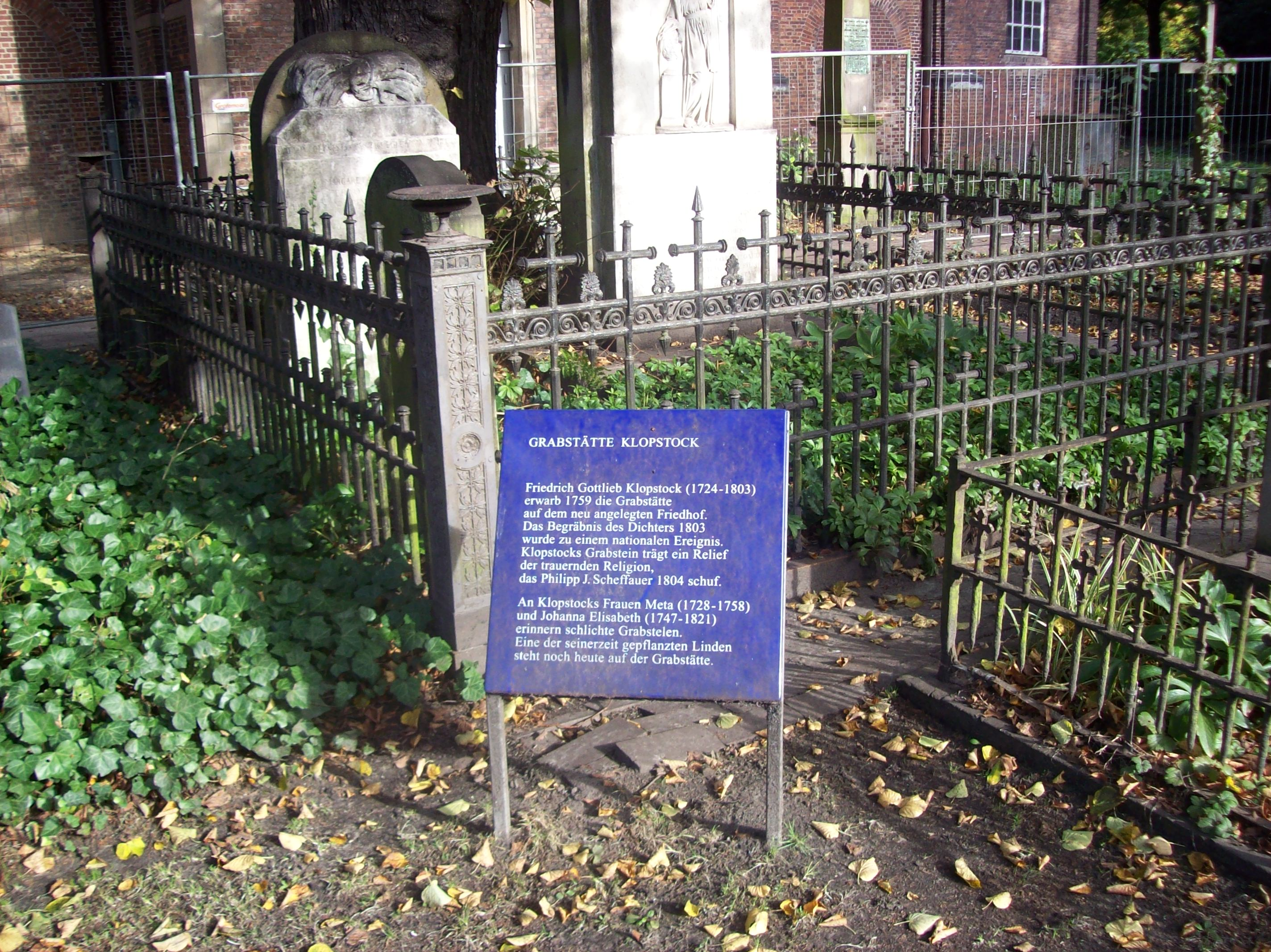
Graves of Meta, her husband and her husband's second wife

Klopstock continued to talk about Meta for the rest of his life, and wrote letters addressed to her spirit.

Meta Klopstock's friendships were important to her; she wrote to Richardson "as happy as I am in love, so happy am I in friendship;- in my mother, two elder sisters and five other women".

She spoke four languages, and knew Latin and Greek.

== Writing ==
Meta Klopstock's letters cover her relationships with friends and family and her developing love for Klopstock over their courtship and the four years of their marriage. She is especially known for her correspondence with the novelist Samuel Richardson. She also wrote an essay, a play, hymns and series of letters written as if from people who had died. Her work has strong religious themes. She was conflicted about whether women should write, or publish.

Her letters were censored by family members after her death. Her work was first translated and introduced to readers in English in 1808 by Elizabeth Smith.

The academic Detlev Schumann, writing in 1960, said "Astonishing is the erotic frankness in these letters: sometimes amusing and sometimes perplexing." He writes that "With a few words she can evoke the mood of a peaceful summer evening on the bank of the Elbe ... describe a crisp winter day in Lingby in a passage that reads like a prose sketch for her husband's later ode "Der Eislauf" ... or give a matter-of-fact account of her household in Copenhagen ... Parts of the correspondence are, for our taste, monotonously effusive [and have] repetitious sentimentality".

The academic Lorely French has described her letters as "lively" and having "wit and openness". French notes that her letters to her women friends and to her sister show "more personal fears and concerns, as well as interaction with her own social world, in general a more diverse gamut of human emotions".

== Legacy ==
Meta Klopstock's letters received praise in the eighteenth and nineteenth centuries, but were then "forgotten and neglected until 1950". In that year a collection of the Klopstocks' papers was acquired by the library of the University of Hamburg, and their correspondence published in 1956. There was further interest in her work in the 1980s as part of feminist literary criticism.

Meta Klopstock was described in Aunt Judy's Magazine in 1867 as someone "one might almost take ... as [a] type of the highest caste of national female character".

The Ladies' Repository in 1848 described her letters to Richardson as "charming", and said that she had "an almost idolatrous love of her husband".

Her death was discussed in detail in magazines in the nineteenth century.

21st-century critics have discussed Meta Klopstock's uncertainty about having her letters published.

She is seen as part of the Empfindsamkeit literary movement (Sentimentalism).

The academic Lesley Sharpe has commented on the "power" that the Klopstocks' relationship had "for future generations ... the combination of romantic love and religious sentiment ... such was the resonance for the next generation of their relationship that she became almost a mythical figure". The academic Ruth P Dawson describes her as "a model of the modest woman, one who might write, and write well, but not publish".

== Works ==
- Der Tod Abels (1757)
- Briefe von Verstorbenen an Lebendige (1757)
- Hinterlaßne Schriften Hinterlassene Werke von Margareta Klopstock (1759)
- Ein Brief über die Moden (1816)
- Meta Klopstock geborene Moller: Briefwechsel mit Klopstock, ihren Verwandten und Freunden (1956)
  - Volume 1: 1751–1754
  - Volume 2: 1754–1758
  - Volume 3: Erläuterungen
