= Emma Roberts (author) =

English travel writer and poet (1791–1840)

Emma Roberts (27 March 1791 – 17 September 1840), often referred to as "Miss Emma Roberts", was an English travel writer and poet known for her memoirs about India. In her own time, she was well regarded, and William Jerdan considered her "a very successful cultivator of the belles lettres".

== Early life ==
Emma Roberts was born on 27 March 1791, either in London or (according to other sources) in Methley, near Leeds. She was one of three children of Captain William Roberts and his wife, Eliza. The family was of Welsh origin, and had strong military links: William was in the Russian service, and afterwards paymaster of an English regiment; his brother was General Thomas Roberts, who raised the 111th Regiment of Foot in 1794; and Emma's brother became a lieutenant in the army, but died young.

After her father died, her mother took Emma and her elder sister to Bath. Her mother is said to have "some literary pretensions".

Emma received some of her education from Frances Arabella Rowden, an engaging teacher with a particular enthusiasm for the theatre. Mary Russell Mitford describes her as not only a poet, but with "a knack of making poetesses of her pupils". This links Roberts to several notable writers such as Caroline Ponsonby, later Lady Caroline Lamb; Anna Maria Fielding, who published as Mrs. S. C. Hall; and Rosina Doyle Wheeler, who married Edward Bulwer-Lytton and published her many novels as Rosina Bulwer Lytton. At the Hans Place boarding school, Roberts was a roommate of Letitia Elizabeth (Landon) Maclean, the poet "L. E. L." of whom she wrote a memoir.

Emma Roberts should not be confused with her near-contemporary Jane Roberts, with whom she corresponded.

== Career ==
Roberts's literary career began with the publication of Memoirs of the Rival Houses of York and Lancaster ... in 1827. She reportedly thoroughly researched her subject, but it was not unreservedly received. Then her mother died and her sister married an officer stationed in Bengal. When her sister and brother-in-law left for India, Roberts accompanied them. Her sister died in 1831 and Roberts moved to Calcutta, where she edited a periodical named the Oriental Observer. However her health reportedly failed and she returned to England by 1833. While in India Roberts published a small volume of "descriptive" poetry, and stories or essays about things she had seen in India. These were later collected and published as books. Both the poetry and the travel book were well received. Although many works of this era are notably dated, a current assessment is that "[h]er compassion for the people of India, her prodigious memory, and her straightforward style make Roberts rather accessible to the twenty-first century reader".

Back in England Roberts turned to editing for a while. She edited a new edition (the 64th) of Maria Rundell's cookery book A New System of Domestic Cookery, and also a book of poetry by her friend Letitia Landon. But by 1839 she decided to return to India, not simply by sailing directly, but by crossing overland from France, through Egypt to Suez, and then by ship to Bombay. She went with only a female friend and took only two months to complete her journey, arriving at the end of October. This was a similar journey to that made by Anne Elwood, who thought Roberts's journey too quick. Roberts wrote a book about her journey. In India she returned to editing, the Bombay Gazette being one title.

In April 1840 she was taken ill while on a visit to Satara. She moved to Poona to recover, but only a day after arriving died there on 17 September. She was buried the same day, near the grave of Maria Jane Jewsbury. Her account of her journey to Bombay was published posthumously in 1841.

== Works ==
- Memoirs of the Rival Houses of York and Lancaster, historical and biographical: embracing a period of English history from the accession of Richard II. to the death of Henry VII (1827)
- Oriental Scenes (1832)
- Scenes and Characteristics of Hindostan; with sketches of Anglo-Indian society (1835)
- Views in India, China, and on the Shores of the Red Sea; Drawn by Prout, Stanfield, Cattermole, Purser, Cox, Austen, &c. from original sketches by Commander Robert Elliott, R.N.; with descriptions by Emma Roberts (1835)
- The Zenana and Minor Poems of Letitia Elizabeth Landon: with a memoir by Emma Roberts (1837)
- Notes of an Overland Journey through France and Egypt to Bombay (1841)
