= Augustan Reprint Society =

American academic society arranging facsimile editions with scholarly introductions

The Augustan Reprint Society was a book publisher founded in 1946, based in Los Angeles, California. The Society has reprinted many rare works, drawn largely from the collections of the William Andrews Clark Library at University of California, Los Angeles (UCLA).

== Establishment ==
The Augustan Reprint Society was founded in 1945 by Edward Niles Hooker and H. T. Swedenberg, Jr. of UCLA and Richard Charles Boys of the University of Michigan. The Society specialized in publishing reprints of English literature from the seventeenth and eighteenth centuries, with individual titles ranging from the very well-known (e.g. Grey's Elegy) to manuscripts whose existences were theretofore unknown. The Society's publications were issued by the William Andrews Clark Library. As of its twentieth anniversary in 1966, the Society had issued 127 reprints. Each of the volumes was a photographic facsimile of a significant work, accompanied by a scholarly introduction.

== AMS Press ==
In 1990, production and distribution of the Society's publications was transferred from the Clark Library to the AMS Press, which specializes in scholarly monograph and annual publications. An editorial board composed of members of the UCLA faculty continued to select and edit items for the series.
