= Anne Elwood =

British traveller, writer and biographer

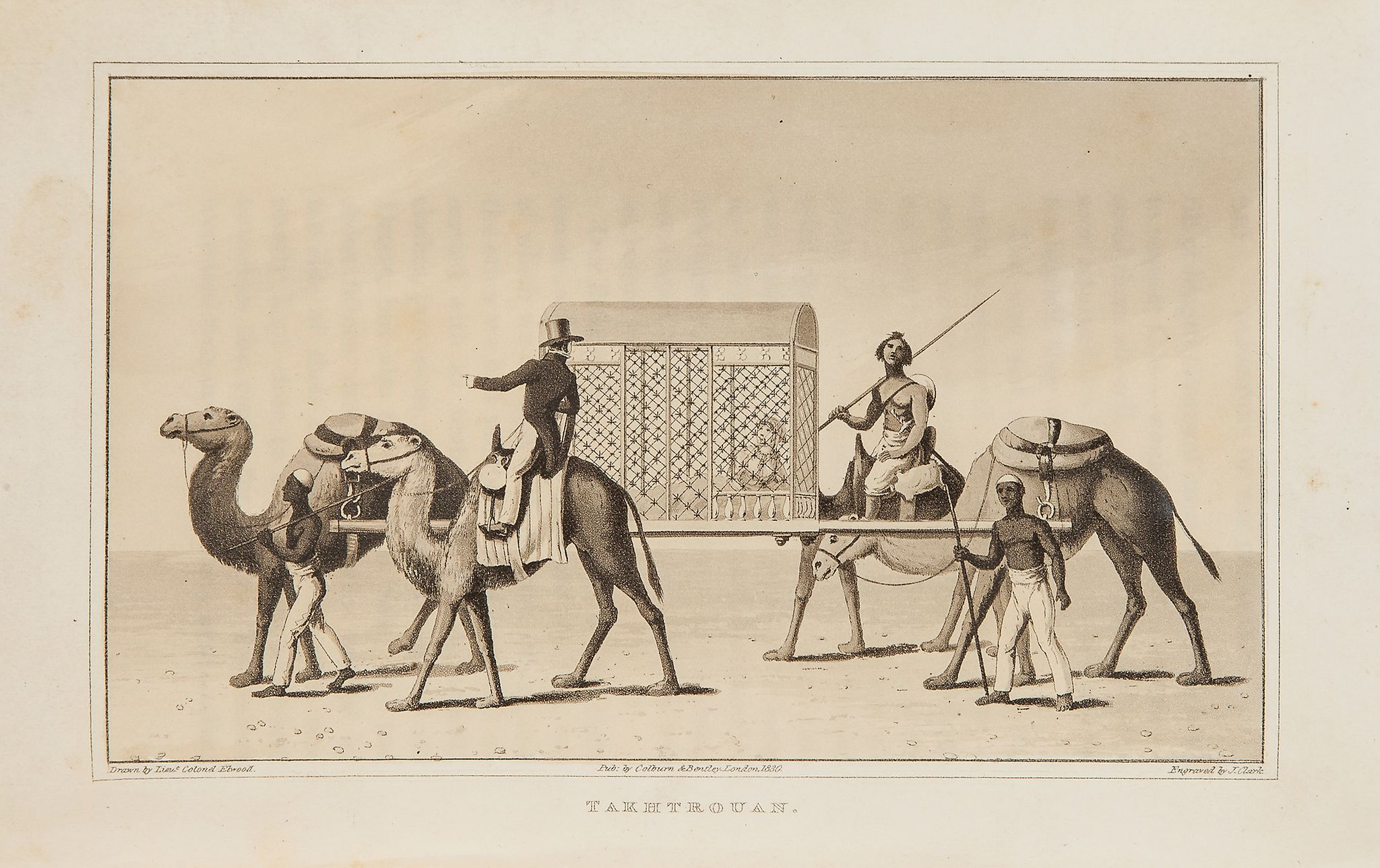
- Elwood was carried between two camels
- Born: 1796
- Died: 24 February 1873 (aged 76–77); Clayton Priory
- Occupation: writer
- Writing career
- Pen name: Mrs Elwood
- Subjects: travel and biography

Anne Elwood (née Curteis, 1796 – 24 February 1873) was a British traveller, writer, and biographer. It was claimed that she was the first woman to travel overland from Britain to India.

== Life ==
Anne was born in 1796 to Edward Jeremiah Curteis, a writer and independent Member of Parliament for Sussex, and his wife Mary Curteis. They lived near Battle.

She married on 9 January 1824 to Major Charles William Elwood, who was about 15 years older than her and had worked for the East India Company for many years. The couple set off for India in 1825 and it was claimed that she was the first British woman to travel overland to India. She described her journey using the device of letters home which she published after her return as Narrative of a Journey Overland from England to India in 1830. The book describes her journey to India via Egypt and is illustrated by Elwood and her husband. She advised on the need for riding habits, three days of underwear, and several evening dresses. In addition to descriptions of her time in India while her husband was leading a regiment, Elwood's book also includes material on the couple's return to England in 1828 by sea.

Her second book was also remarkable. Elwood claims in the preface that she could not find a book about women writers and so she decided to write one. Memoirs of the literary ladies of England from the commencement of the last century, published in 1841, describes the lives of 29 leading women writers. Elwood knew several of the subjects and she was given access to their documents. The book was well regarded and was used as a source for the Dictionary of National Biography, though her writing was not always objective. She included Emma Roberts among her leading women, a poet and travel writer who had also travelled to India, though Elwood thought Roberts's journey of two months in 1839 was too fast. Memoirs was reprinted in a modern edition in 1973 by AMS Press.

Elwood died in Clayton Priory, Sussex, in 1873.

== Works ==
- Narrative of a Journey Overland from England, by the Continent of Europe, Egypt, and the Red Sea, to India, Including a Residence There, and Voyage Home, in the Years 1825, 26, 27, and 28 By Mrs Colonel Elwood. London: Henry Colburn and Richard Bentley, 1830. (Vol. I, Vol. II, Internet Archive)
- Memoirs of the literary ladies of England from the commencement of the last century. London: H. Colburn, 1843. (Vol. I, Vol. II, Google)
