= Friedrich Gottlieb Klopstock =

German poet (1724–1803)

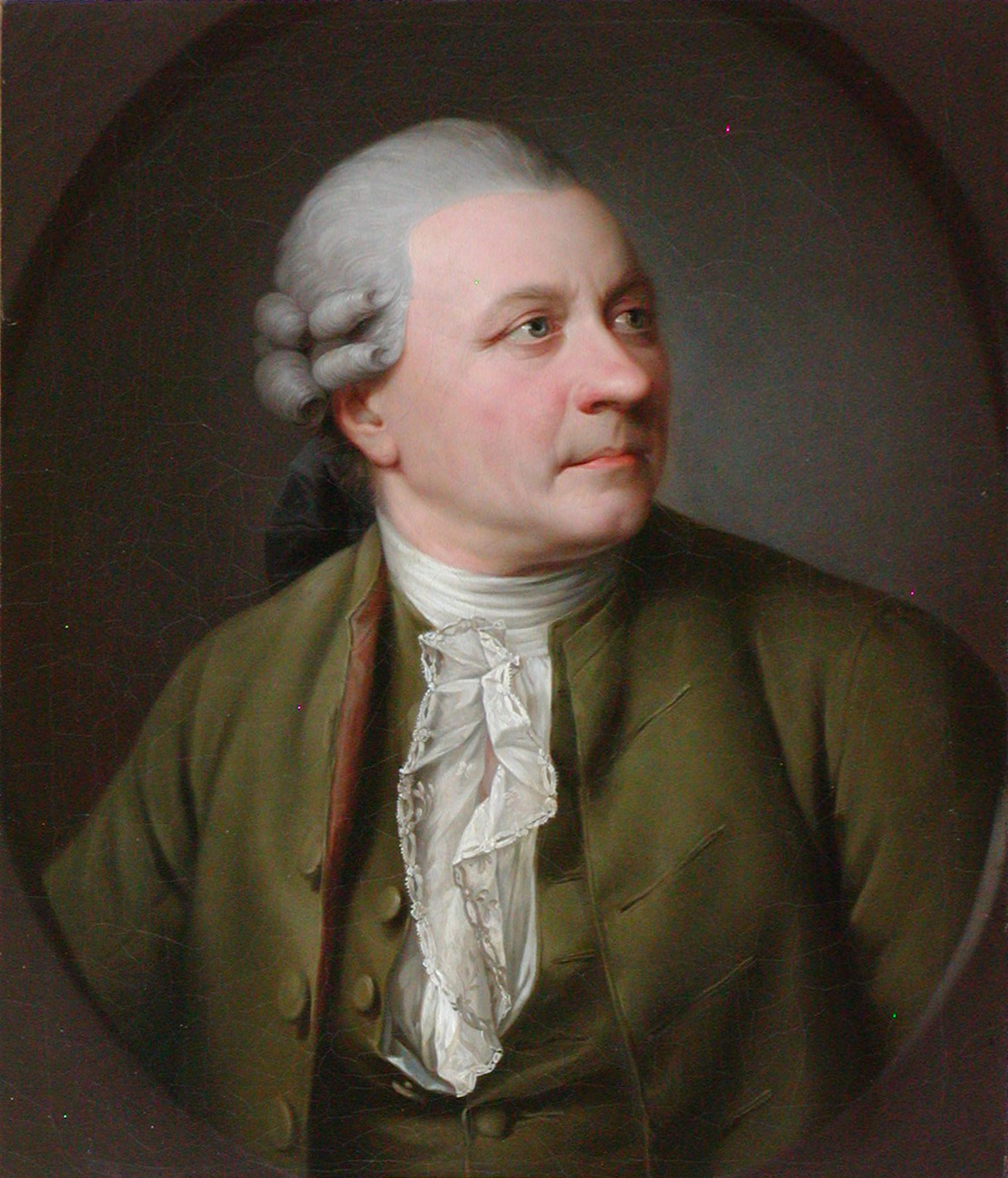
- Portrait by Jens Juel, c. 1779
- Born: 2 July 1724; Quedlinburg, Holy Roman Empire
- Died: 14 March 1803 (aged 78); Hamburg, Holy Roman Empire
- Spouse(s): Meta Moller; Johanna Elisabeth von Winthem
- Writing career
- Language: German
- Genre: Poetry
- Movement: Sentimentalism

Friedrich Gottlieb Klopstock (German: [ˈklɔpʃtɔk]; 2 July 1724 – 14 March 1803) was a German poet. His best known works are the epic poem Der Messias ("The Messiah") and the poem Die Auferstehung ("The Resurrection"), with the latter set to music in the finale of Gustav Mahler's Symphony No. 2. One of his major contributions to German literature was to open it up to exploration outside of French models.

== Biography ==
=== Early life ===
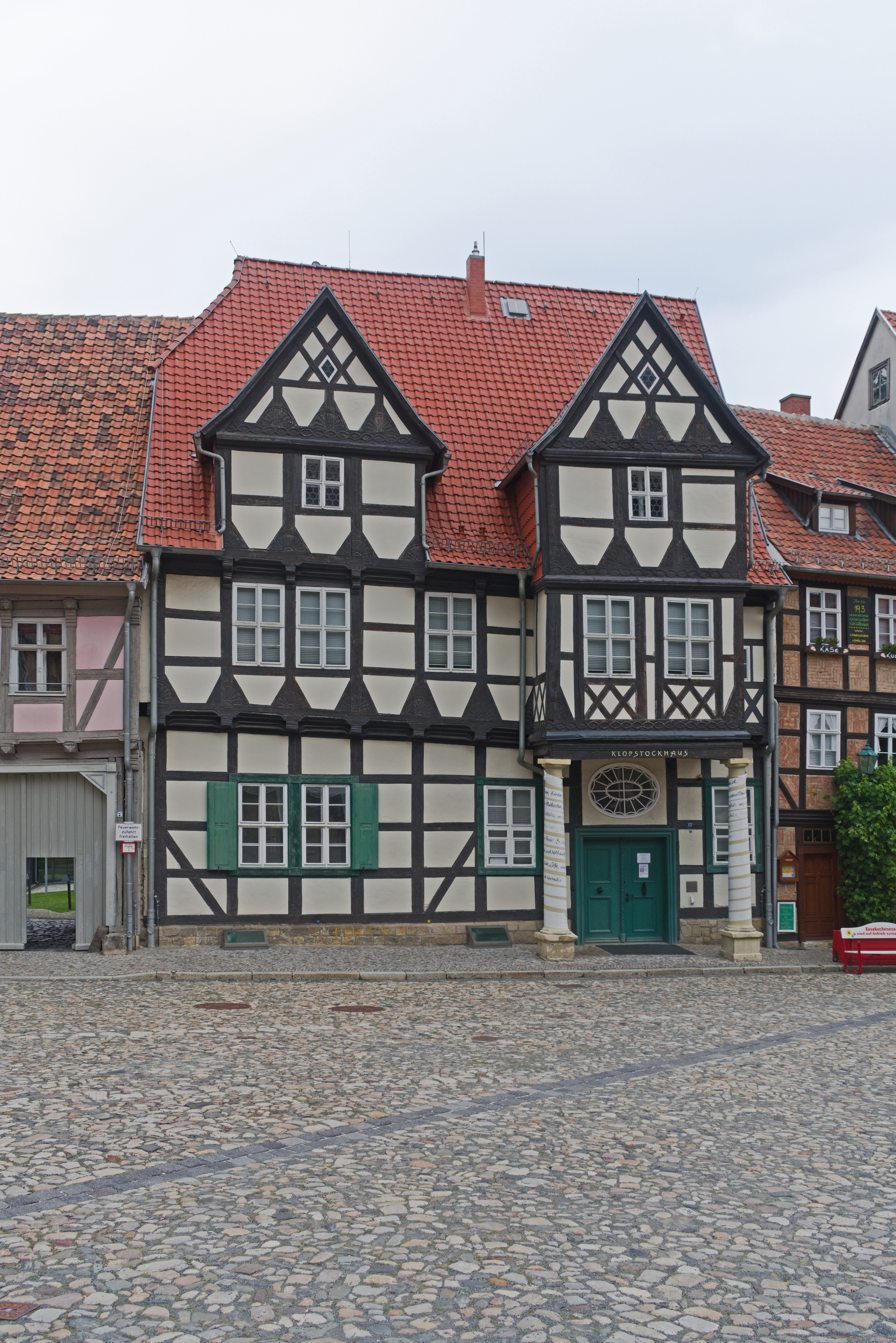
Klopstock's birthplace in Quedlinburg

Klopstock was born on 2 July 1724 at Quedlinburg, the eldest son of a lawyer. Both in his birthplace and on the estate of Friedeburg on the Saale, which his father later rented, he spent a happy childhood. Having been given more attention to his physical than to his mental development, he grew up strong and healthy and was considered an excellent horseman. In his thirteenth year, he returned to Quedlinburg and attended the gymnasium there, and in 1739 went on to the famous classical school named Schulpforta. Here he soon became adept in Greek and Latin versification, and wrote some meritorious idylls and odes in German. His original intention of making Henry the Fowler the hero of an epic was abandoned in favor of a religious epic, under the influence of Milton's Paradise Lost, with which he became acquainted through Bodmer's translation.

While still at school, he had already drafted the plan of Der Messias on which most of his fame rests. On 21 September 1745 he delivered, on quitting school, a remarkable "departing oration" on epic poetry—Abschiedsrede über die epische Poesie, kultur- und literargeschichtlich erläutert—and next proceeded to Jena as a student of theology, where he drew up in prose the first three cantos of the Messias. Finding life at that university not to his liking, he transferred in the spring of 1746 to Leipzig, where he joined a circle of young men of letters who contributed to the Bremer Beiträge. In this periodical the first three cantos of Der Messias were published anonymously in hexameter verse in 1748.

=== Denmark and Germany ===
A new era in German literature had commenced, and the identity of the author soon became known. In Leipzig he also wrote a number of odes, the best known of which is An meine Freunde (1747), afterwards recast as Wingolf (1767). He left the university in 1748 and became a private tutor in the family of a relative at Langensalza, where unrequited love for a cousin (the "Fanny" of his odes) disturbed his peace of mind. For that reason he gladly accepted in 1750 an invitation from Bodmer, the translator of Paradise Lost, to visit him in Zürich, where Klopstock was initially treated with every kindness and respect and rapidly recovered his spirits. Bodmer, however, was disappointed to find in the young poet of the Messias a man of strong worldly interests, and a coolness sprang up between the two men.

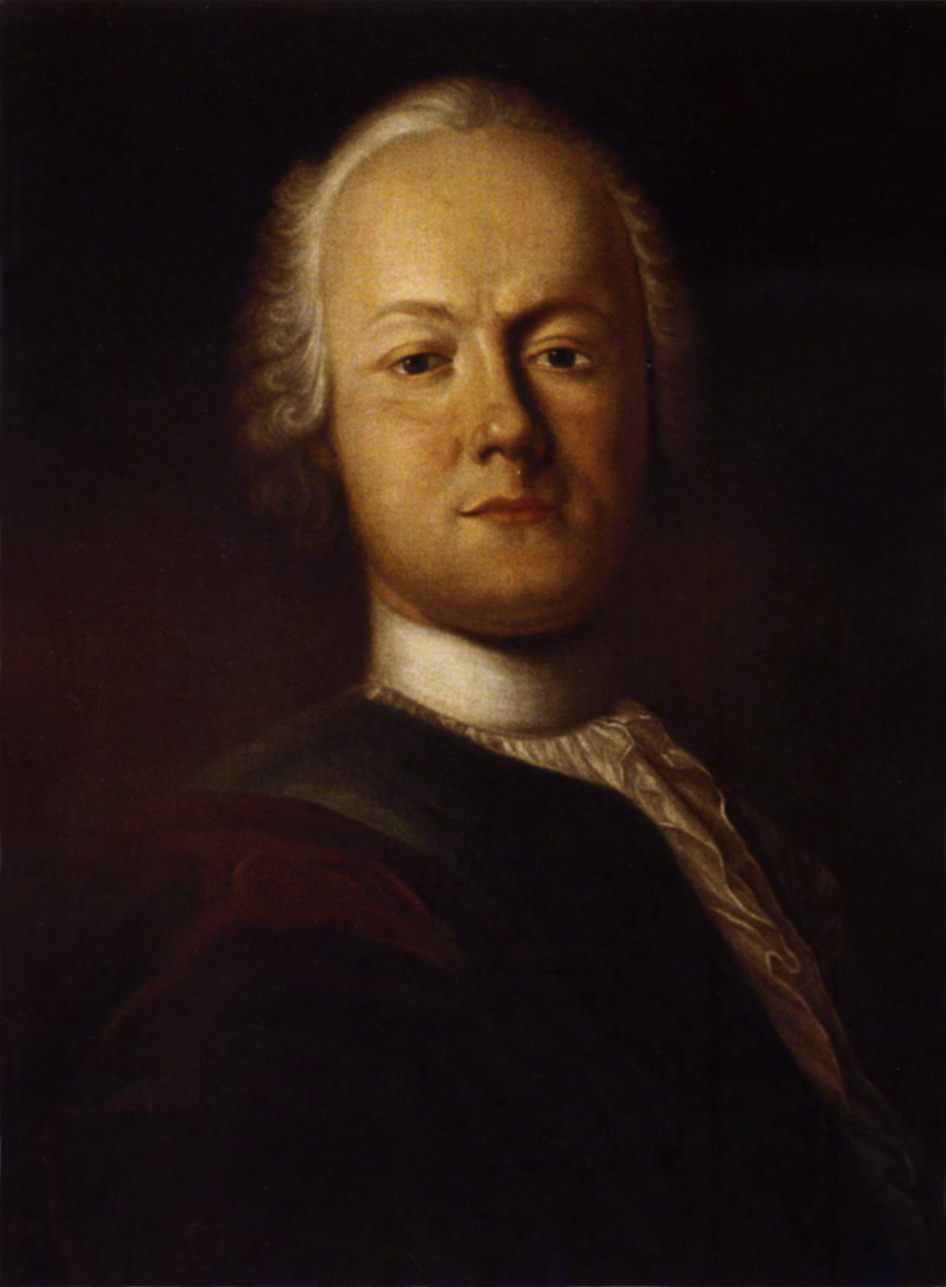
Portrait by Johann Caspar Füssli, c. 1750

At this juncture Klopstock received from Frederick V of Denmark, on the recommendation of his minister Count von Bernstorff (1712–1772), an invitation to settle in Copenhagen with an annuity of 400 thalers, in the hope that he would complete Der Messias there. The offer was accepted.

On his way to the Danish capital, Klopstock met in Hamburg the woman who later in 1754 became his wife, Margareta or Meta Moller, the "Cidli" of his odes. She was the daughter of a Hamburg merchant and an enthusiastic admirer of his poetry. His happiness was short, as she died in childbirth in 1758, leaving him broken-hearted. His grief at her loss finds pathetic expression in the fifteenth canto of the Messias. The poet subsequently published his wife's writings, Hinterlassene Werke von Margareta Klopstock (1759), which give evidence of a tender, sensitive and deeply religious spirit. See also Memoirs of Frederick and Margaret Klopstock (English translation by Elizabeth Smith, London, 1808) and her correspondence with Samuel Richardson, published 1818.

=== Depression and Messias ===
Klopstock now relapsed into melancholy; new ideas failed him, and his poetry became more introspective. He continued to live and work in Copenhagen, however, and next, following Heinrich Wilhelm von Gerstenberg, turned his attention to northern mythology, which in his view should replace classical subjects in a new school of German poetry. In 1770, when King Christian VII dismissed Count Bernstorff from office, he retired with the latter to Hamburg but retained his pension, together with the rank of councillor of legation.

In 1773 were published the last five cantos of the Messias. In the following year he published a scheme for the regeneration of German letters, Die Gelehrtenrepublik (1774). In 1775 he traveled south, and making the acquaintance of Goethe on the way, spent a year at the court of the Margrave of Baden at Karlsruhe. Thence, in 1776, with the title of Hofrath and a pension from the Margrave, which he retained along with that from the king of Denmark, he returned to Hamburg where he spent the remainder of his life.

=== Last years ===
His latter years he passed, as had always been his inclination, in retirement, only occasionally relieved by socializing with his most intimate friends, occupied in philological studies and taking scant interest in the new developments in German literature. However, he was enthusiastic about the American War of Independence and the French Revolution. The French Republic sent him a diploma of honorary citizenship; but, horrified at the terrible scenes the Revolution had enacted in the name of liberty, he returned it.

At the age of 67 he undertook a second marriage, to Johanna Elisabeth von Winthem, a widow and a niece of his late wife, who for many years had been one of his most intimate friends. He died in Hamburg on 14 March 1803, mourned throughout Germany, and was buried with great ceremony next to his first wife in the churchyard of the village of Ottensen.

== Works ==
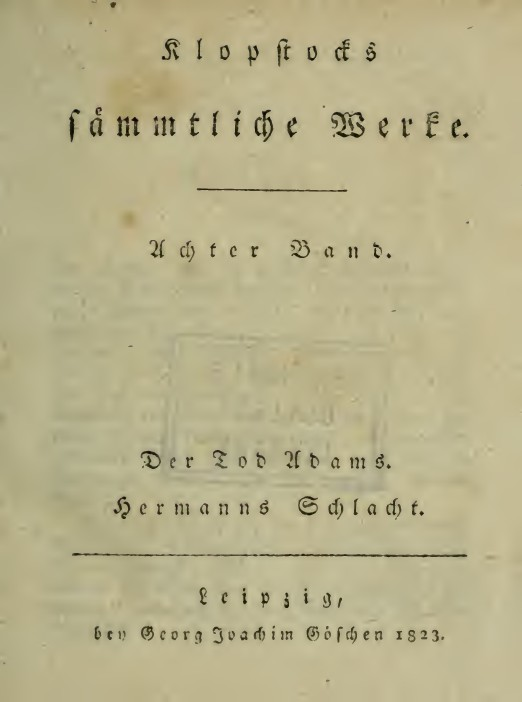
Der Tod Adams. Hermanns Schlacht (1823)

=== Der Messias ===
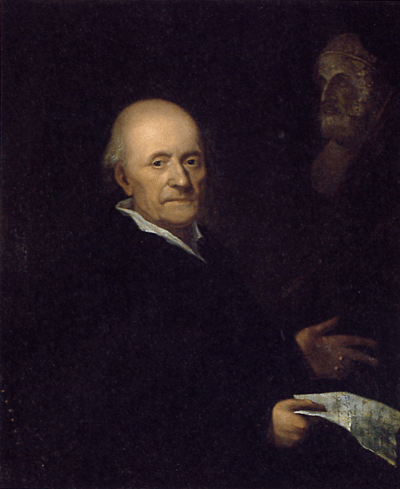
Painting of Klopstock by Maria Elisabeth Vogel

The Messias follows from the aspirations to become an epic poet, which Klopstock nurtured in his early years. The leitmotif of the work is the Redemption, which is given an epic treatment. He resorted to Christian literary traditions in trying to circumscribe the subject-matter within the dogmas of the Church.

Milton's Paradise Lost was one of the models Klopstock had in mind in giving form to his poem. The poem took twenty-five years to complete. The work aroused intense public enthusiasm at its commencement. It has been translated into seventeen languages, and led to numerous imitations.

=== Odes and dramas ===
In his odes Klopstock had more scope for his distinctive talent. Some have Nordic mythological inspiration, while others emphasize religious themes. Among the most celebrated and translated are An Fanny; Der Zürchersee; Die tote Klarissa; An Cidli; Die beiden Musen; Der Rheinwein; Die frühen Gräber, Mein Vaterland. His religious odes mostly take the form of hymns, of which the most beautiful is Die Frühlingsfeier.

In some of his dramas, notably Hermanns Schlacht (1769) and Hermann und die Fürsten (1784), Klopstock celebrated the deeds of the ancient German hero Arminius, and in others, Der Tod Adams (1757) and Salomo (1764), he took his materials from the Old Testament. These also represent an important part of his body of work. Composer Sigrid Henriette Wienecke used Klopstock's writings as the text for her musical drama Fader Vor. He immortalized his 1750s visit at the Swiss Au peninsula in his Ode an den Zürichsee ("Ode to Lake Zurich").

It has been said that Klopstock's hymn "Die Auferstehung" at the funeral of Hans von Bülow in 1894 gave Gustav Mahler the inspiration for the final movement of his Second Symphony. Mahler incorporated the hymn with extra verses he wrote himself to bring a personal resolution to this work.

Klopstock published odes and hymns, including Der am Kreuz ist meine Liebe, which is in shortened and revised form part of the 2013 Catholic hymnal Gotteslob.

=== Prose ===
In addition to Die Gelehrtenrepublik, he was also the author of Fragmente über Sprache und Dichtkunst (1779) and Grammatische Gespräche (1794), works in which he made important contributions to philology and to the history of German poetry.

=== Correspondence ===
As was common in the period, Klopstock kept up an abundant correspondence with his contemporaries, friends, and colleagues, and this has been published in diverse collections. Some of them are listed below:

- K. Schmidt, Klopstock und seine Freunde (1810); this is the basis for Klopstock and his friends. A series of familiar letters, written between the years 1750 and 1803, translated and introduced by Elizabeth Benger (London, 1814).
- Christian August Heinrich Clodius, Klopstocks Nachlass (1821).
- J. M. Lappenberg, Briefe von und an Klopstock (1867).

=== Editions ===
Klopstock's Werke first appeared in seven quarto volumes (1798–1809). At the same time a more complete edition in twelve octavo volumes was published (1798–1817), to which six additional volumes were added in 1830. Other nineteenth-century editions were published in 1844–1845, 1854–1855, 1879 (ed. by R. Boxberger), 1884 (ed. by R. Hamel) and 1893 (a selection edited by F. Muncker). A critical edition of the Odes was published by F. Muncker and J. Pawel in 1889; a commentary on these by H. Düntzer (1860; 2nd ed., 1878).

== Goethe's description ==
Goethe in his autobiography recorded his personal impression of Klopstock: "He was of small stature, but well built. His manners were grave and decorous, but free from pedantry. His address was intelligent and pleasing. On the whole, one might have taken him for a diplomatist. He carried himself with the self-conscious dignity of a person who has a great moral mission to fulfil. He conversed with facility on various subjects, but rather avoided speaking of poetry and literary matters."

== Legacy ==
Klopstock's enrichment of poetic vocabulary and attention to prosody did great service to the poets who immediately followed him. In freeing German poetry from its exclusive interest in Alexandrine verse, he became the founder of a new era in German literature, so that Schiller and Goethe were artistically indebted to him. An 800-year-old oak tree where Klopstock spent time in Denmark was named after him.
