= Thomas Wagstaffe =

Thomas Wagstaffe the Elder (13 February 1645 – 17 October 1712) was a clergyman of the Church of England, after the nonjuring schism a bishop of the breakaway church.

== Early life ==
Wagstaffe was born on 13 February 1645 at Binley in Warwickshire, and was named after his father, who had settled there and married Anne Avery of Itchington; he was related to Sir Joseph Wagstaffe and to William Wagstaffe the physician. He was educated at Charterhouse School. After a short period at Pembroke College, Cambridge in the early 1660s, he moved on in Lent term 1660 to New Inn Hall, Oxford, and graduating B.A. on 15 October 1664, M.A. on 20 June 1667. Two years later he was ordained deacon by John Hacket, Bishop of Lichfield, and in the same year priest by Joseph Henshaw, Bishop of Peterborough, on his institution to the benefice of Martinsthorpe. He became chaplain to Sir Richard Temple, 3rd Baronet (1634–1697), and was made curate of Stowe.

== Deprived as nonjuror ==
In 1684 Wagstaffe was preferred to the chancellorship of Lichfield Cathedral and a prebend, by James II, Bishop Thomas Wood being incapacitated through suspension. In the same year, also at the presentation of the king as patron of the rectory of St. Gabriel Fenchurch, London (with St. Margaret Pattens); he was deprived at the Glorious Revolution of both posts, since he refused to take the new oaths. For some time he made his living by practising as a physician, still wearing clerical dress, and treating William Sancroft and Francis Turner, Bishop of Ely. With Archbishop Sancroft he spent some time before his death at Fressingfield in Suffolk.

== Nonjuring consecration ==
In 1693 the nonjurors exploited the Suffragan Bishops Act of Henry VIII, not in force since the reign of Queen Elizabeth, to continue a succession of their bishops. George Hickes went over to Château de Saint-Germain-en-Laye, France in 1693 with a list of nonjurors, from which James II selected the names of Hickes himself and Wagstaffe as bishops. Nonjurors held that James was king, in law, and William Lloyd, whose suffragans the new bishops were to be, was Bishop of Norwich (Sancroft still being regarded as Archbishop of Canterbury); so it was held that the conditions of the act were duly complied with. Before giving his consent James had the approval of Pope Innocent XII, François de Harlay de Champvallon, and Jacques-Bénigne Bossuet. Wagstaffe therefore was nominated bishop of Ipswich, and Hickes of Thetford, both in the diocese of Norwich. Their consecrations took place on 24 February 1694, at the house of the Rev. Mr. Giffard at Southgate in the parish of Enfield, near London, which apparently was occupied by White, the deprived bishop of Peterborough. A third supposed bishop—Lloyd of Norwich taking the lead—took part in the ceremony, Francis Turner, deprived of Ely. The service was quite private, and the consecrations were for a long time unknown to some of the leading nonjurors. Hearne, who at Oxford was in frequent communication with Hickes and Wagstaffe, knew nothing of these consecrations as late as 1732. The only persons present were, besides the bishops, Lord Clarendon and a notary named Douglas. Wagstaffe joined with the former in attesting Hickes's deed of consecration, Hickes doing a like service for him. There is no record of Wagstaffe performing any episcopal duties. There were no consecrations during his lifetime, nor does it appear that he ordained any of the few admitted to holy orders during that time.

== Later life ==
Wagstaffe passed much of the rest of his days in Warwickshire, but was present when holy communion was given to John Kettlewell on his deathbed in London in 1695. In the following year, after a warrant for his arrest, he appeared with Thomas Ken and three more of the deprived bishops, besides others, before the privy council. He was there to defend his share in a charitable recommendation of the nonjuring clergy and their families. He was released, with the others, on 23 May.

The Post Boy of 23–5 October 1712 recorded his death:

"On Friday the 17th instant died the Reverend Dr. Wagstaffe, at his house at Binley, near Coventry. He was a person of extraordinary judgment, exemplary piety, and unusual learning; and had he not had the misfortune to dissent from the established government by not taking the oaths, as he had all the qualities of a great divine, and a governor of the church, so he would have filled deservedly some of the highest stations in it."

He had a good library, which was sold in London by Fletcher Gyles in 1713.

== Works ==
Wagstaffe was the author of a series of religious and political pamphlets. These included his prominent Vindication of King Charles the Martyr (1693).

=== Eikon Basilike controversy ===
The authorship of Eikon Basilike, a work of royalist apologetics published in 1649 shortly after the execution of Charles I, flared up as a topic of controversy in the 1690s. In Vindication of King Charles the Martyr, proving that his Majesty was the author of Εἰκὼν Βασιλική, Wagstaffe defended the authorship of Charles I.

There was a claim that a particular prayer in the work had been plagiarised: in the second edition (1697) of his work, Wagstaffe sourced an explanation to Henry Hills, parliamentarian printer. Hills had heard it from Thomas Gill and Francis Bernard, physicians. Wagstaffe accused John Milton and John Bradshaw of deliberate insertion into the work; and stated that Milton had used William Dugard to implement the insertion of the prayer.

A few years later, Wagstaffe returned to the table-turning attack on Milton's integrity, in replying to the Amyntor of John Toland. It became a commonplace of Jacobite propaganda, and was used by Ned Ward.

=== Other works ===
Wagstaffe gave an account of Archbishop Sancroft's illness and death, in A Letter out of Suffolk (1694; reprinted in Somers's Tracts, 1751). His Present State of Jacobitism in England (1701?), was in answer to Gilbert Burnet, who had advised the nonjurors to end their troubles by taking the oaths. Wagstaffe contrasted the severity with which the nonjurors were treated with the comparative leniency of Cromwell under the Commonwealth, or Elizabeth, towards Catholics. Burnet replied in The Present State of Jacobitism in England. The Second Part).

Other pamphlets were:

- A Letter to the Author of a late Letter out of the Country occasioned by a former Letter to a Member of the House of Commons concerning the Bishops lately in the Tower and now under Suspension (1690?);
- An Answer to a late Pamphlet entitled “Obedience and Submission to the present Government demonstrated from Bishop Overall's "Convocation Book",” with a postscript in answer to Dr. Sherlock's “Case of Allegiance,” London, 1692;
- An Answer to Dr. Sherlock's "Vindication of the Case of Allegiance due to Sovereign Powers" made in Reply to an Answer to a late Pamphlet entitled ”Obedience and Submission to the present Government demonstrated from Bishop Overall's "Convocation Book",’ with a postscript in answer to Dr. Sherlock's "Case of Allegiance", London, 1692;
- An Answer to a Letter of Dr. Sherlock written in Vindication of that part of Josephus's "History" which gives the Account of Jaddas' Submission to Alexander, in answer to the piece entitled "Obedience and Submission to the present Government" (1691);
- Remarks on some late Sermons, and in particular on Dr. Sherlock's Sermon at the Temple, December the 30th, 1694, in a Letter to a Friend (1695);
- A Letter to a Gentleman elected a Knight of the Shire to serve in the present Parliament, London, 1694;
- An Account of the Proceedings in Parliament in relation to the Recoining of Clipped Money, London, 1696 (1696; another edit. 1697–8; a proclamation was issued in 1696 by the king for the discovery of the author of the pamphlet, which was published anonymously).

Some works published under the name of Samuel Grascome have also been attributed to Wagstaffe.

== Family ==
Wagstaffe married Martha Broughton, by whom he had four sons and five daughters. His first-born son died in infancy. The second son, Thomas Wagstaffe (1692–1770), was another prominent nonjuror. One of his daughters married Dr. William Wagstaffe: encouraged by Wagstaffe, William Wagstaffe went to London and later secured appointment as physician to St. Bartholomew's Hospital. The wife died not long after the marriage, and he remarried, to a daughter of Charles Bernard.

== Notes ==
Attribution

This article incorporates text from a publication now in the public domain: Lee, Sidney, ed. (1899). "Wagstaffe, Thomas". Dictionary of National Biography. Vol. 58. London: Smith, Elder & Co.
