= Laurence Howell =

Howell, Laurence (c.1664–1720), nonjuring Church of England clergyman

The Reverend Laurence Howell
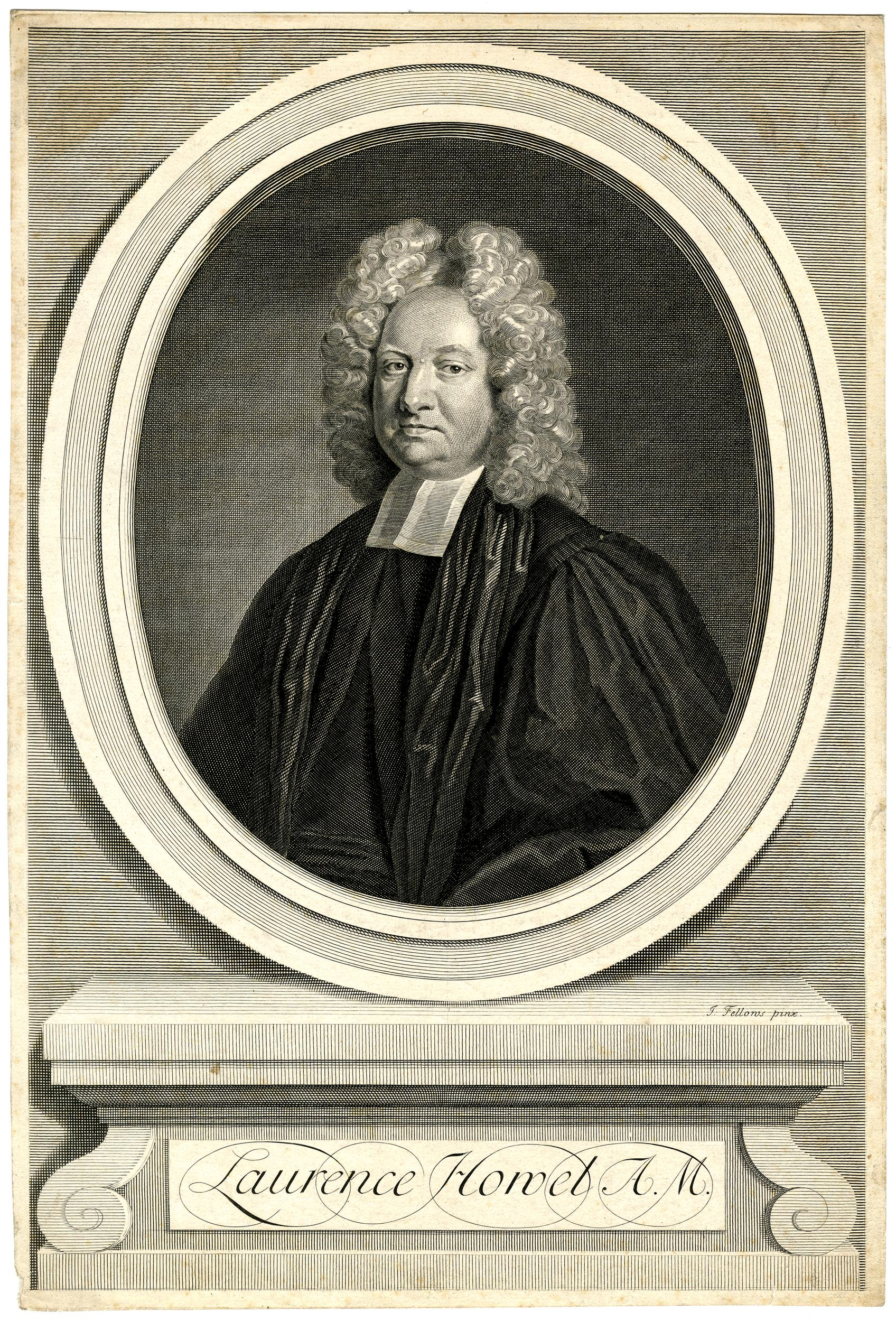
- Portrait of Laurence Howell, half-length, in an architectural oval, slightly turned to the left, dressed in an academic gown with bands at his neck and a periwig on his head, the title in a cartouche below (c. 1720s–1750s)

Orders
- Ordination: 2 October 1712 by George Hickes

Personal details
- Born: c. 1664 Deptford
- Died: 19 July 1720 Newgate Prison
- Denomination: Anglican
- Education: Jesus College, Cambridge

Laurence Howell (c. 1664–1720) was a nonjuring Church of England clergyman and divine.

== Life ==
Howell was born about 1664 at Deptford and received his education at Lewisham Grammar School, where he was a foundation scholar, and Jesus College, Cambridge, where he graduated BA in 1684 and MA in 1688. He was a zealous member of the nonjuring party, and probably left the university in 1688. In 1708 the Lord Mayor ordered that the Oath of Abjuration should be tendered to him. On 2 October 1712 he was ordained priest by George Hickes, suffragan bishop of Thetford, in his oratory at St. Andrew's, Holborn. In the list of nonjurors at the end of Kettlewell's Life it is stated that Howell was at the Revolution master of the school at Epping, and curate of Estwich, Suffolk, but there is no such parish in that county, and Eastwick, Hertfordshire, may be meant. (Note: Martin, History of Thetford, ed. Gough, p. 39.) He composed the speech which William Paul, a nonjuring clergyman, who was convicted of taking part in the rebellion, delivered at his execution on 13 July 1716. (Note: Disney, Memoirs of Dr. Sykes, pp. 33, 34.) He also wrote a pamphlet for private circulation entitled The Case of Schism in the Church of England truly stated. In this seditious work George I was denounced as a usurper, and all that had been done in the church, subsequently to Archbishop Sancroft's deprivation, was condemned as illegal and uncanonical. Howell was arrested at his house in Bull Head Court, Jewin Street, and about a thousand copies of the pamphlet were seized there. A prosecution was first instituted against Redmayne, the printer, who was sentenced to pay a fine of 500l., to be imprisoned for five years, and to find security for his good behaviour for life. Howell was tried at the Old Bailey on 28 February 1716–17 before the Lord Mayor and Justices Powys and Dormer. The jury found him guilty, and two days afterwards he was sentenced to pay a fine of 500l., to be imprisoned for three years without bail, to find four sureties of 500l. each, and himself to be bound in 1,000l. for his good behaviour during life, and to be twice whipped. On his hotly protesting against the last indignity on the ground that he was a clergyman, the court answered that he was a disgrace to his cloth, and that his ordination by the so-called bishop of Thetford was illegal. By the court's direction the common executioner there and then roughly pulled his gown off his back. A few days later, on his humble petition to the King, the corporal punishment was remitted. He died in Newgate on 19 July 1720.

There is an engraving which professes to be a portrait of him, but Noble says the plate was altered from a portrait of Robert Newton, D.D. (Note: Continuation of Granger, iii. 152.)

== Works ==
Howell was a man of learning and published:

1. Synopsis Canonum SS. Apostolorum, et Conciliorum (Ecumenicorum et Provincialium, ab Ecclesiâ Græcâ receptorum; necnon Conciliorum Œcumenicorum et Provincialium ab Ecclesiâ Græcâ receptorum; necnon Conciliorum, Decretorum, et Legum Ecclesiæ Britannicæ et Anglo-Saxonicæ; unà cum Constitutionibustam Provincialibus (sc. à Stephano Langton ad Henricum Chichleum) quam Legatinis &c. in Compendium redactis (London, 1708, fol.) Hearne disliked Howell's Latin, and said that a dedication to the Earl of Salisbury was prepared, but not accepted on the ground that the "patronising a nonjuror would be taken ill by the government".
2. Synopsis Canonum Ecclesiæ Latinæ, et Decreta: quâ Canones spurii, Epistolæ adulterinæ, et Decreta supposititia istius Ecclesiæ Conciliorum in lucem proferuntur, et a veris ac genuinis dignoscuntur (London, 1710, fol.) In 1715 the third and last volume of the Synopsis Canonum was announced "as once more finished" by Howell, the first manuscript having been burnt in the fire which destroyed Bowyer's printing-house, 30 January 1712. (Note: Nichols, Literary Anecdotes i. 57.)
3. The Orthodox Communicant, by way of Meditation on the Order for the Administration of the Lord's Supper, with vignettes from Scripture subjects by J. Sturt (London, 1712, 1714, 1721, 1781, 8vo).
4. A View of the Pontificate: From its supposed Beginning to the End of the Council of Trent, A.D. 1563. In which the Corruptions of the Scriptures and Sacred Antiquity, Forgeries in the Councils, and Incroachments of the Court of Rome on the Church and State, to support their Infallibility, Supremacy, and other Modern Doctrines, are set in a true Light (London, 1712, 8vo). The second edition, 1716, is entitled The History of the Pontificate.
5. Desiderius, or the Original Pilgrim: A Divine Dialogue. Shewing the most compendious Way to arrive at the Love of God. Render'd into English and explain'd with Notes (London, 1717).
6. A Compleat History of the Holy Bible, in which are inserted occurrences that happen'd during the space of about four hundred years from the days of the Prophet Malachi to the birth of our Blessed Saviour, 3 vols. (London 1718, 8vo, with 150 cuts by J. Sturt); again 1725; fifth edition 1729; and with additions and improvements by G. Burder, 3 vols. (London, 1806–7).
7. A Memoir of Dr. Walter Raleigh, dean of Wells, prefixed to Raleigh's treatise entitled ‘Certain Queries proposed by Roman Catholicks (London: 1719).

His miscellaneous collections for a history of the University of Cambridge are in the Bodleian Library (Rawl. B. 281). The Medulla Historiæ Anglicanæ, sometimes attributed to Howell, is by Dr. William Howell (1638?–1683).

== Sources ==
- Addit. MS. 5871, f. 66 b;
- Memoirs of the Life of Kettlewell, p. 391, App. pp. xxiii, xxvi;
- Historical Register for 1717, p. 119, and Chronological Register pp. 12, 13 for 1720 (Chronological Diary), p. 29;
- Lathbury's Nonjurors, p. 367;
- Lowndes's Bibliographer's Manual (Bohn), p. 1128;
- Nichols's Literary Anecdotes i. 31, 32, 57, 87, 105, 106, 107, 124, 702;
- Hearne's Collections, ed. Doble (Oxford Historical Society), ii. 35, 38, 103, 125;
- Political State of Europe, xii. 259, 263, 281, xiii. 354, 356;
- Information from C. E. Doble, Esq.
