= Ralph Taylor (divine) =

English clergyman

Ralph Taylor (1647 – 26 December 1722) was an English clergyman, nonjuror and sometime chaplain to the court of James II at Saint-Germain-en-Laye.

== Life ==
Son of Revd William Taylor and Judith Charlett of South Littleton. Educated Trinity College, Oxford, matriculated 22 March 1666 – 1667; BA 1670; MA 1673; BD 1682; DD 1686. Installed as rector of Grafton Flyford 1678, then in 1684 as rector of Severn Stoke. Some of the entries in the parish book of Severn Stoke written in Taylor's hand suggest that he had no great respect or honour for James II:

Malum omen [bad day]. November 2nd [1688] for mending of ye King's arms in ye Church, 6s. 0d. Fausta dies [fortunate day]. November 5th [1688] Given to ye Ringers then, 5s. 0d."

Having previously sworn an oath of allegiance to James II of England, he refused to take the oath of allegiance to William and was deprived of the living. Taylor remained in Worcestershire with some contact with George Hicks, nonjuring Dean of Worcester.

By 1699, Taylor was chaplain to the court of James II at Saint-Germain-en-Laye. Little is known of his time there beyond that he attended the funeral of Denis Granville, that he owned one or more telescopes, and that he was given two gold sleeve buttons by James II. During this time, he felt the need to deny that he had converted to Roman Catholicism. In December 1712, he petitioned Queen Anne to be allowed to return from France.

On return to England, Taylor took the side of the non-usager faction in the split of about 1717. Taylor was consecrated bishop at Gray's Inn, 25 January 1721, by the nonjuring non-usager bishops, Samuel Hawes, Nathaniel Spinckes and Henry Gandy, in the presence of the Earl of Winchilsea, Robert Cotton, Revd Thomas Bell and John Blackbourne. He consecrated Richard Welton as bishop. Then Taylor and Welton consecrated John Talbot but the consecration was not recognised by other nonjurors as Welton had been consecrated by Taylor alone.

Taylor died 26 December 1722 at his brother's house in South Littleton and interred at the church in South Littleton.

A 1722 portrait by John Verelst engraved by George Vertue was published in 1723.
