= George Harbin =

English clergyman and political writer

George Harbin (c.1665-1744) was an English clergyman, a nonjuror and significant political writer.

== Life ==
He graduated B.A. at Emmanuel College, Cambridge, in 1686, took holy orders, and became chaplain to Francis Turner, Bishop of Ely. At the Glorious Revolution he followed Turner by refusing to take the oaths to the new rulers.

After Turner's death he became chaplain and librarian to Thomas Thynne, 1st Viscount Weymouth. He was an intimate friend of Bishop Thomas Ken.

== Works ==
Harbin was the author of the following works:

- The English Constitution fully stated, with some Animadversions on Mr. Higden's Mistakes about it. In a Letter to a Friend, London, 1710. Against William Higden.
- The Hereditary Right of the Crown of England Asserted: The History of the Succession since the Conquest Clear'd: And the True English Constitution Vindicated from the Misrepresentations of Dr. Higden's "View and Defence," &c., London, 1713. This work was wrongly attributed to Hilkiah Bedford, who was fined and imprisoned for three years as its author. There was a preface by Theophilus Downes, who admitted he drew on Robert Brady.

Harbin also wrote an epitaph on Sir Isaac Newton, and assisted Michael Maittaire in his Commentary on the Oxford Marbles (1732). Letters written by Harbin to Arthur Charlett on literary subjects have been preserved in the Bodleian Library.
