= Francis Turner (bishop) =

English Anglican bishop (1637–1700)

The Right Reverend Francis Turner
- Bishop of Ely
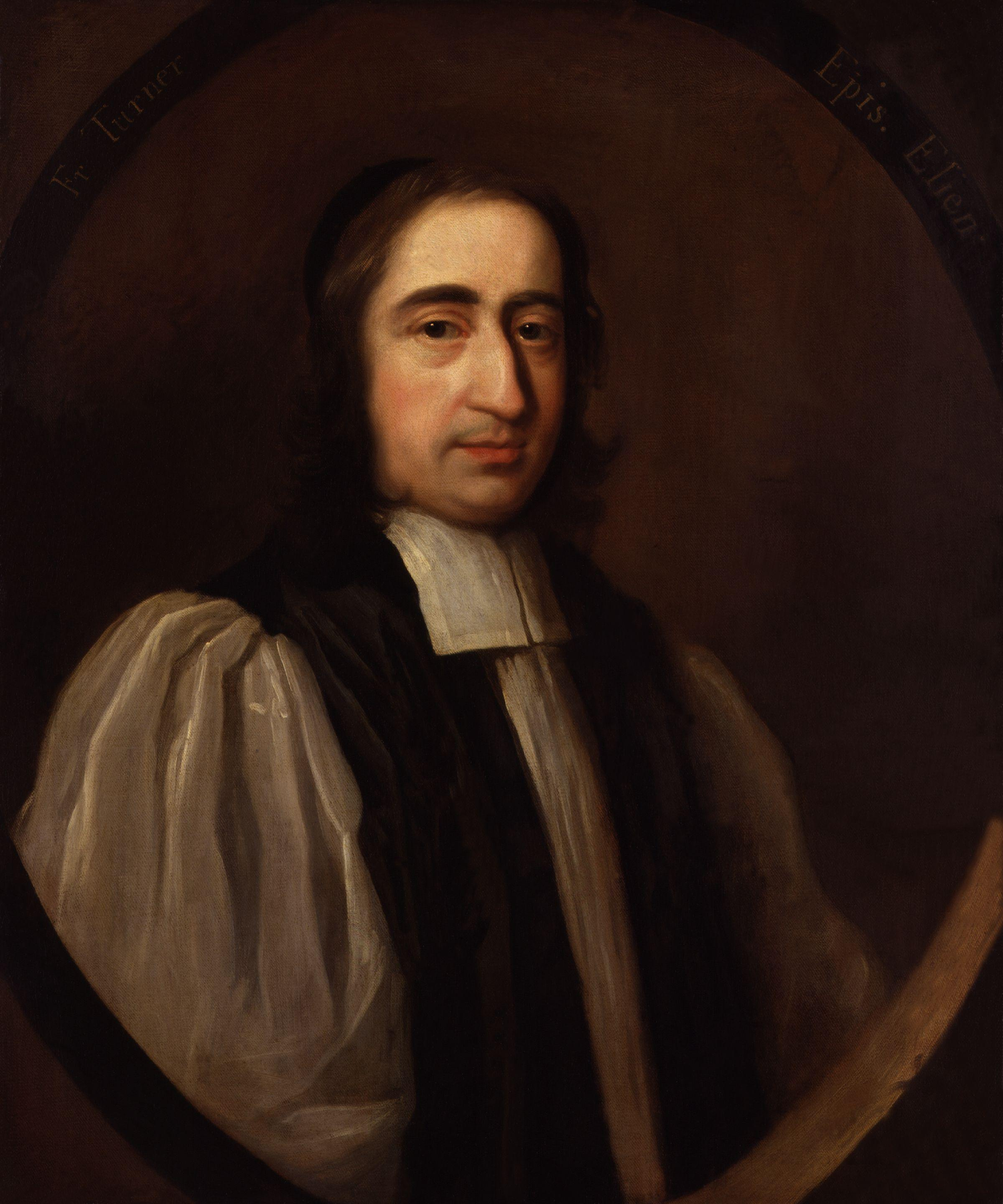
- Portrait by Mary Beale
- Diocese: Diocese of Ely
- Term ended: 1691

Orders
- Ordination: 1683
- Consecration: 11 November 1683 by William Sancroft

Personal details
- Born: 23 August 1637
- Died: 2 November 1700 (aged 63) London, England
- Denomination: Church of England
- Education: New College, Oxford

Francis Turner D.D. (23 August 1637 – 2 November 1700) was Bishop of Ely, one of the seven bishops who petitioned against the Declaration of Indulgence and one of the nine bishops who refused to take the oath of allegiance to William III.

== Family and education ==
Turner was the eldest son of Thomas Turner, the Dean of Canterbury, by Margaret (died 25 July 1692, aged 84), daughter of Sir Francis Windebank. He was born on 23 August 1637, probably in Southwark or Reading. Thomas Turner (1645–1714), the president of Corpus Christi College, Oxford, was his younger brother. Francis married (1676) Anna Horton, who pre-deceased him.

From Winchester College, where he was elected scholar in 1651, Francis proceeded to New College, Oxford, where he was admitted probationer fellow on 7 November 1655, and graduated B.A. on 14 April 1659 and M. A. on 14 January 1663.

== Ecclesiastical and academic preferment ==
Turner's preferments were mainly due to the favour of the Duke of York, to whom he was chaplain. On 30 December 1664 he was instituted to the rectory of Therfield, in Hertfordshire, succeeding John Barwick. On 17 February 1664-5 he was incorporated at Cambridge, and on 8 May 1666 he was admitted fellow commoner in St John's College, Cambridge, to which the patronage of Peter Gunning, the Regius Professor of Divinity, attracted him. He compounded BD and D.D. at Oxford on 6 July 1669. On 7 December 1669 he was collated to the prebend of Sneating in St Paul's Cathedral. On 11 April 1670 he succeeded Gunning as Master of St John's, Cambridge; he was vice-chancellor in 1678, and resigned his mastership, "because of a faction," at Christmas 1679. In 1683 he became rector of Great Haseley, Oxfordshire, and on 20 July of that year he was installed Dean of Windsor. He was consecrated Bishop of Rochester, at Lambeth on 11 November 1683, holding his deanery in commendam, with the office of Lord High Almoner. On 16 July 1684 he was translated to Ely (confirmed 23 August) in succession to Gunning, who had made him one of his literary executors. He preached the sermon at James II's coronation (23 April 1685); in the following July he prepared James Scott, 1st Duke of Monmouth for his execution.

== Religious and political controversy ==
Turner's obligations to James did not prevent him from joining in the petitionary protest (18 May 1688) of the seven bishops against the king's declaration for liberty of conscience. He also declined the oath of allegiance to William and Mary, and hence incurred suspension on 1 August 1689; his diocese was administered by a commission consisting of Henry Compton, Bishop of London, and William Lloyd, Bishop of St Asaph; on 1 February 1690 he was deposed. He was in correspondence with James; two unsigned letters to James and his queen, dated 31 December 1690, and seized on the arrest of John Aston, are certainly his. He professes to write "in behalf of my elder brother, and the rest of my nearest relations, as well as for myself" (meaning William Sancroft and the other nonjuring bishops). A proclamation for his arrest was issued on 5 February 1691, but he kept out of the way.

On 24 February 1693 he joined the nonjuring bishops, William Lloyd and Thomas White, in consecrating George Hickes and Thomas Wagstaffe as suffragans of Thetford and Ipswich, the object being to continue a succession in the Jacobite interest. Henry Hyde, 2nd Earl of Clarendon, was present at the ceremony, which took place at White's lodging. In 1694 it was proposed that Turner, who was in easy circumstances, should be invited to St Germains in attendance on James, a proposal which James approved but did not carry out.

In December 1696 Turner was arrested, as the nonjuror Samuel Grascome was sought, but then discharged (15 December) on condition of leaving the country. On 26 December he was rearrested. With John Somers, Baron Somers arguing for him, he survived.

== Death and posterity ==
No more is heard of Turner till his death, which occurred in London on 2 November 1700. He was buried on 5 November in the chancel at Therfield. His intestacy gave all his effects to his daughter Margaret (died 25 December 1724), wife of Richard Gulston of Wyddial Hall, Hertfordshire, thus disappointing the expectation of bequests to St John's College, of which he had already been a benefactor.

Turner is an ancestor of Henrietta Euphemia Tindal (née Harrison), a 19th-century poet and novelist, who was the great-granddaughter of a later Richard Gulston of Wyddial Hall, and of the Tindal-Carill-Worsley family.

Besides single sermons (1681–5) Turner published:

- Animadversions on a Pamphlet entituled "The Naked Truth" (1676, anonymously; against Herbert Croft, Bishop of Hereford).
- Letters to the Clergy of the Diocese of Ely (1686).

A portrait of Turner, painted probably by Mary Beale, was transferred from the British Museum to the National Portrait Gallery in 1879. He also figures in the anonymous portrait of the seven bishops in the same gallery.

== Works by Bishop Turner ==
- MacDonogh, Rev. T. M. (Terence Michael). Brief Memoirs of Nicholas Ferrar: founder of a Protestant religious establishment at Little Gidding, Huntingdonshire. Chiefly collected from a Narrative by the Right Rev. Dr, Turner, Formerly Lord Bishop of Ely; And now edited, with Additions. Second Edition. London: Jacob Nisbet, 1837. Internet Archive downloadable pdf Google Books downloadable pdf
- A sermon preached before Their Majesties K. James II, and Q. Mary, : at their coronation in Westminster-abby, 23 April 1685. (1685) Internet Archive downloadable pdf

== See also ==
- Nonjuring schism

Academic offices
Preceded by Peter Gunning	Master of St John's College, Cambridge; 1670–1679	Succeeded by Humphrey Gower
Church of England titles
Preceded by John Dolben	Bishop of Rochester; 1683–1684	Succeeded by Thomas Sprat
Preceded by Peter Gunning	Bishop of Ely; 1684–1691	Succeeded by Simon Patrick
