= Nathaniel Spinckes =

English nonjuring clergyman

Nathaniel Spinckes (1653–1727) was an English nonjuring clergyman, a leader in the dispute among the nonjurors about the "usages" which split the "non-usagers", (those who advocated the retention of the Book of Common Prayer as it was), against returning to the first prayer-book of Edward VI, as the "usagers", led by Jeremy Collier, advocated.

== Life ==
He was born at Castor, Northamptonshire, where his father, Edmund Spinckes, was rector of the parish. His mother was Martha, eldest daughter of Thomas Elmes of Lilford, to whom Edmund Spinckes was chaplain. Nathaniel received his early education from a neighbouring clergyman, Samuel Morton, rector of Haddon (then in Huntingdonshire). On 9 July 1670 he matriculated at Trinity College, Cambridge; in 1673 he migrated to Jesus College where he was elected scholar on the Rustat foundation. He graduated B.A. in 1674, and M.A. in 1677.

On 21 May 1676, he was ordained deacon by Henry Compton, Bishop of London, in the chapel of London House, and on 22 December 1678 he was ordained priest by Thomas Barlow, Bishop of Lincoln, at St Margaret's Church, Westminster. He acted for some time as chaplain to Sir Richard Edgcomb in Devon. He then moved to Petersham, and in 1681 became chaplain to John Maitland, 1st Duke of Lauderdale, forming a lifelong friendship with his fellow chaplain, George Hickes. Following the Duke's death in August 1682, he went to London where he became curate and lecturer at St Stephen Walbrook. In 1685 he was presented by the dean and chapter of Peterborough to the rectory of Peakirk-cum-Glinton in the north corner of Northamptonshire. There he married Dorothy, daughter of Thomas Rutland of London.

On 21 July 1687, he was installed in the prebend of Major Pars Altaris in Salisbury Cathedral, and on 24 September 1687 was instituted to the rectory of St Martin's, Salisbury, of which Francis Hill was patron.

After the Glorious Revolution he declined to take the oath of allegiance to William III and Mary II, and was deprived of all his preferments in 1690. He had inherited a small patrimony from his father, who died in 1671, but this was not sufficient to maintain his family. He received support from the more wealthy nonjurors. Among the many friends of Spinckes was Robert Nelson, who made him a bequest.

He was entrusted with the management of the fund raised by the deprived bishops; and on Ascension Day 1713 he was consecrated bishop, together with Jeremy Collier and Samuel Hawes, by his friend Hickes, as suffragan-bishop of Thetford, assisted by two Scottish bishops, Archibald Campbell and James Gadderar, at Hickes's own private chapel in St Andrew's, Holborn. Spinckes died 28 July 1727, and was buried in the cemetery of the parish of St Faith, on the north side of St Paul's Cathedral, in London, his wife surviving him only one week. Of a large family, only two survived their parents: William, who became a successful merchant; and Anne, who married Anthony Cope.

== Works ==
He was a voluminous writer. His major publications were:

- 'The Essay towards a Proposal for Catholick Communion, &c., answered Chapter by Chapter' [against reconciliation of the church of England with the church of Rome, proposed by Mr. Bassett], 1705.
- 'The New Pretenders to Prophecy re-examined, and their Pretences shown to be Groundless and False,' 1705.
- 'Mr. Hoadly's Measures of Submission to the Civil Magistrates enquired into and disproved,' pt. i. 1711; pt. ii. 1712.
- 'The Sick Man visited, and furnished with Instructions, Meditations, and Prayers,' 1st ed. 1712; 2nd ed. 1718; 3rd ed. 1722; 4th ed. 1731.
- 'The Case truly stated; wherein "The Case re-stated" is fully considered' [i.e., the case between the church of Rome and the church of England]. 'By a Member of the Church of England,' 1714.
- 'A Collection of Meditations and Devotions in Three Parts,' 1717.
- 'The Case farther stated between the Church of Rome and the Church of England, wherein the Chief Point about the Supremacy is fully discussed in a Dialogue between a Roman Catholic and a member of the Church of England,' 1718.
- 'No Sufficient Reason for Restoring the Prayers and Directions of King Edward VI's First Liturgy,' 2 parts, 1718.
- 'No Just Grounds for introducing the New Communion Office, or denying Communion to those who cannot think themselves at liberty to reject the Liturgy of the Church of England for its sake. In answer to a late Appendix and to Dr. Brett's Postscript,' 1719.
- 'The Article of Romish Transubstantiation inquired into and disproved from Sense, Scripture, Antiquity, and Reason,' 1719.
- 'The Church of England Man's Companion in the Closet, with a Preface by N. Spinckes,' 1721; a manual of private devotions collected, probably by Spinckes himself, from the writings of William Laud, Lancelot Andrewes, Thomas Ken, George Hickes, John Kettlewell, and Spinckes, which reached a fifteenth edition in 1772, and was republished in 1841.

Besides these works, Spinckes wrote a preface to his friend Hickes's Sermons on Several Subjects, (published in two volumes in 1713), and also published a volume of posthumous discourses by Hickes, with a preface, in 1726. He is said to have assisted in the publication of John Ernest Grabe's Septuagint, of Richard Newcourt's Repertorium Ecclesiasticum, of Laurence Howell's Canons, of John Potter's Clemens Alexandrinus, and of John Walker's Sufferings of the Clergy.
