= Henry Gandy =

English non-juring bishop

Henry Gandy (1649–1734) was an English non-juring bishop.

== Life ==
The son of John Gandy of South Brent, Devon, he was born on 14 October 1649; his father was a priest of the Church of England who had been deprived of his living during the English Civil War. He entered Merchant Taylors' School in 1663, and went on to Oriel College, Oxford, where he matriculated on 15 March 1667. He graduated B.A. 17 October 1670, M.A. in 1674, and was elected Fellow on 30 November 1670. He served as a proctor, elected 18 April 1683.

Gandy was senior fellow of Oriel when he was deprived for refusing the oath of allegiance to William III and Mary II, in 1690. As a nonjuror he was a leading if anonymous controversialist; and advocated for maintaining the schism in the Church of England, when Thomas Ken, the sole survivor of the original deprived bishops, in 1710 expressed a wish that the breach should be closed. At that point Henry Dodwell, Robert Nelson and Francis Brokesby returned to the Anglican fold.

In 1716 Gandy was consecrated bishop by Jeremy Collier, Nathaniel Spinckes, and Samuel Hawes (died 1722). When the divisive issue of "usages" arose in 1717, he left Collier's party, and followed Spinckes in staying close to Anglican ritual. In 1720 he joined Spinckes and Hawes in consecrating Hilkiah Bedford and Ralph Taylor (who was to return to the Church of England); on 11 June 1725 he assisted in consecrating John Blackbourne; and in 1726, in consecrating Henry Hall. on 25 March 1728. He presided at the consecration of Richard Rawlinson, and in the same year at that of George Smith (1693–1756).

Gandy died in Scroop's Court, Holborn, the location of his chapel, on 26 February 1734, and was buried in St Pancras churchyard. He left a wife Ann and daughter Anne. His congregation at Scroop's Court passed to Richard Rawlinson and Robert Gordon or Gordoun.

== Works ==
Gandy's publications included:

- A Letter in Vindication of the Answer to the Queries concerning Schism and Toleration, 1701, (anon.)
- Old England ... the Government of England . . . hereditary, 1705 (anon.)
- Jure Divino: or an Answer to all ... Republicans, 1707, (anon.)
- Bibliotheca Scriptorum Ecclesiæ Anglicanæ. . . . Tracts relating to the government ... of the Church of England, 1709 (anon.)
- A Conference between Gerontius and Junius. In which Mr. Dodwell's "Case in View now in Fact" is considered, 1711.

He wrote a preface to The Subject's Sorrow [1710], by Robert Brown.

== Notes ==
Attribution

This article incorporates text from a publication now in the public domain: Lee, Sidney, ed. (1901). "Gandy, Henry". Dictionary of National Biography (1st supplement). Vol. 2. London: Smith, Elder & Co.
