= Robert Nelson (nonjuror) =

English lay religious writer

Robert Nelson (22 June 1656 – 16 January 1715) was an English lay religious writer and nonjuror.

== Life ==
Robert was born in London on 22 June 1656, the only surviving son of John Nelson, a merchant in the Turkey trade, by Delicia, daughter of Sir Lewis and sister of Sir Gabriel Roberts, who, like John Nelson, were members of the Levant Company. John Nelson died on 4 September 1657, leaving a good fortune to his son. His mother sent Robert for a time to St Paul's School, but then took him home. She settled at Driffield Gloucestershire, the home of her sister Anne, wife of George Hanger, also a member of the Levant Company. Here George Bull, then rector of Siddington in the neighbourhood, acted as his tutor. He entered Trinity College, Cambridge, as fellow commoner in 1678, but never resided.

As early as 1680 he began an affectionate correspondence with John Tillotson, who was a friend of Sir Gabriel Roberts. He was chosen a fellow of the Royal Society on 1 April 1680. He then went to Paris, accompanied by his schoolfellow, Edmund Halley, and afterwards made the grand tour, returning in August 1682. During his travels he met at Rome Lady Theophila Lucy, widow of Sir Kingsmill Lucy, 2nd Baronet, of Broxbourne, Hertfordshire, and second daughter of George Berkeley, 1st Earl of Berkeley. She had a son twelve years old by her first husband, and was two years Nelson's senior. He married her on 23 November 1682, the marriage having been postponed for a time in consequence of the elopement of her sister with Lord Grey of Werke. She had, it is said, been converted to Catholicism at Rome by Cardinal Philip Howard, and Nelson was not aware of this until after their marriage; but it may have been later. A Discourse concerning a Judge of Controversy in matters of Religion, published in 1686, upon the Roman Catholic side of the question, is ascribed to her, and in the next year Nelson wrote against transubstantiation.

He took Theophila to Aix-la-Chapelle on account of her health. He left her there during a visit to England in 1688; but the Glorious Revolution made him return to the continent. He travelled, with his wife and her son and daughter by her first marriage, to Rome. He lived for a time at Florence, and corresponded with John Drummond, 1st Earl of Melfort, James II's envoy to the Pope. He was a Jacobite in his sympathies, though not engaged in any active measures. He returned by way of Germany and the Hague to England in 1691, and settled at Blackheath. Tillotson died in his arms on 22 November 1694.

He had meanwhile joined the nonjurors. He became very intimate after 1691 with John Kettlewell, the nonjuring divine, and Kettlewell, dying in 1695, made him his executor. It was by Kettlewell's advice that he began the religious writings by which he is best known, and he supplied Francis Lee with materials for Kettlewell's life. Through Kettlewell he came to know George Hickes, and he was soon in close communication with all the nonjuring circle: Henry Dodwell, Jeremy Collier, Charles Leslie, Francis Brokesby, and others. He remained, however, on good terms with many of the clergy of the established church, and took an active part in various charitable enterprises. He supported the religious societies founded by Anthony Horneck, and the allied Societies for the Reformation of Manners, which aimed at enforcing laws for the suppression of vice. He was an active member of the societies started by Dr. Thomas Bray; the Society for Promoting Christian Knowledge, founded 1698; the Society for the Propagation of the Gospel in Foreign Parts, founded 1701; and the 'Associates of Dr. Bray,' a society which especially aimed at providing parochial libraries. He was active in the movement for establishing charity schools, originally begun by Archbishop Thomas Tenison in the time of James II, and carried on with great success during the reign of Queen Anne. In 1710 he was one of the commissioners appointed by the Tory House of Commons to build fifty new churches in London. He had left Blackheath in 1703, and lived in Ormond Street. His mother died at the end of 1703, and his wife on 26 January 1706, leaving her fortune to him. Nelson, with Dodwell and Brokesby, left the nonjurors on the death of William Lloyd, the last of the deprived bishops except Thomas Ken. Ken expressed to Nelson his desire that the schism should end, and Nelson on Easter Day 1710 received the sacrament from his friend John Sharp, the Archbishop of York . He did not join, however, in the prayers for the royal family, and in 1713 he helped to prepare for the press the Jacobite treatise of George Harbin on Hereditary Right.

He died at Kensington in the house of his cousin, Delicia, then Mrs. Wolf, daughter of Sir Gabriel Roberts, on 16 January 1715 aged 58. He was the first person buried at a new cemetery in Lamb's Conduit Fields. A monument was erected on the spot, with a long inscription by George Smalridge, Bishop of Bristol. It was restored in 1839, when threatened with demolition by the vestry of St. George the Martyr.

== Works ==
Nelson became known during the reign of Queen Anne for his religious writings, some of which were circulated by the Society for Promoting Christian Knowledge. On the death of his old tutor George Bull, on 27 February 1710, Nelson undertook to write a life, which appeared in 1713. Nelson had been acquainted with Jacques-Bénigne Bossuet, to whom he had sent Bull's writings, and a letter written to Nelson by Bossuet in 1700 contained the challenge to which Bull replied in a letter published in Hickes's Controversial Letters, 1705. Nelson's investigation, in his life of Bull, of the use made of Bull's work on the Nicene Creed by Samuel Clarke led to a controversy with Clarke in the next year.

Nelson's works are:

- 'Transubstantiation contrary to Scripture; or the Protestant's Answer to the Seeker's Request,' 1687.
- 'The Practice of True Devotion, in relation to the End as well as the Means of Religion, with an Office for the Holy Communion,' 1698 (anon.); 2nd ed. 1715, preface dated 23 August 1708.
- 'An earnest Exhortation to Householders to set up the Worship of God in their Families . . .' 1702 (anon.)
- 'Companion for the Festivals and Fasts of the Church of England, with Collects and Prayers for each Solemnity,' 1704. In this book, a popular manual of Anglican theology, Nelson was helped by his friends Kettlewell, Lee, Brokesby, and William Cave. In four and a half years ten thousand copies were printed. A thirty-sixth edition appeared in 1826; it was translated into German twice, and Welsh.
- 'The whole Duty of a Christian by way of Question and Answer, exactly pursuant to the Method of the Whole Duty of Man, for the use of Charity Schools about London,' 1704 (anon.)
- 'The Necessity of Church Communion vindicated from the scandalous Aspersions of a late pamphlet, entituled "The Principles of the Protestant Reformation, &c.,"' 1705 (anon.)
- 'A Letter to an English Priest of the Roman Communion at Rome,' 1705 (in Hickes's collection of that year).
- 'The great Duty of frequenting the Christian Sacrifice,' 1707 (enlarged from the chapter on vigils in 'Companion').
- 'Instructions for those that come to be confirmed by way of Question and Answer,' 1706 (also prefixed to 'Christian Sacrifice' in 1712).
- 'The Life of Dr. George Bull . . . with the History of those Controversies in which he engaged, and an Abstract of those fundamental Doctrines which he maintained,' &c., 1713.
- Letter prefixed to James Knight's anonymous 'Scripture Doctrine of the . . . Trinity, vindicated from the Misrepresentations of Dr. Clarke,' 1714.
- 'An Address to Persons of Quality and Estate,' with an appendix of papers, 1715 (reprinted Dublin, 1752), contains many proposals on hospitals, theological colleges, and schools.

Nelson also published Thomas à Kempis's Christian Exercises, Fénelon's Pastoral Letter, and notices in the posthumous works of Kettlewell and Bull.
