= William Wagstaffe =

British physician

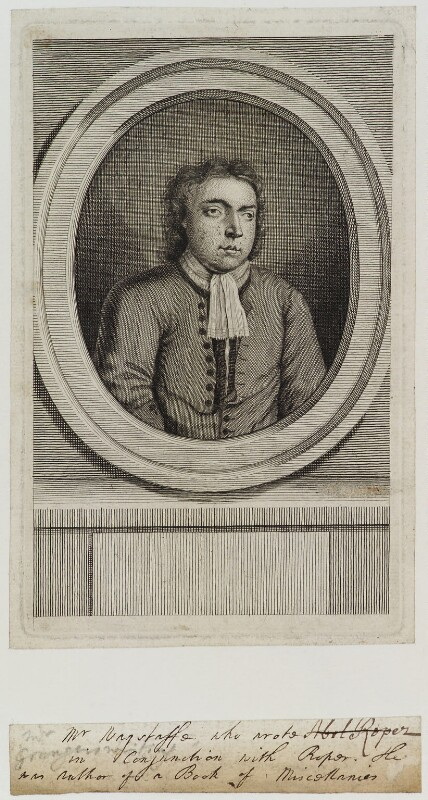
- Born: 1685; Cublington
- Died: 5 May 1725 (aged 39–40); Bath
- Education: Lincoln college, Oxford
- Occupation: physician

William Wagstaffe (1685 – 5 May 1725) was a British physician.

Wagstaffe was born in Cublington, Buckinghamshire, UK, The only son of the town's rector, and related to the Wagstaffe family of Knightcote, Warwickshire. He was educated at a school in Northampton, entered Lincoln College, Oxford in 1701, and graduated B.A. (16 June 1704) and M.A. (5 May 1707). The same year, he joined the London "practice of physics" of his relative Thomas Wagstaffe. He married Thomas' daughter and, after her early death, married the daughter of surgeon Charles Bernard.

On 8 July 1714, Wagstaffe graduated M.B. and M.D. at Oxford. He became a fellow of the Royal College of Physicians on 22 December 1718, and was a censor in 1720. He became a reader on anatomy to the Barber-Surgeons on 15 December 1715, and succeeded Salisbury Cade as a physician to St. Bartholomew's Hospital on 29 December 1720. He became a fellow of the Royal Society on 13 March 1718.

Wagstaffe died in Bath.

== Works ==
- A Comment upon The History of Tom Thumbe (1711)
- A Letter showing the Danger and Uncertainty of inoculating the Small Pox (1722)
