= William Paul (priest) =

English Jacobite sympathizer and nonjuring Church of England clergyman

The Reverend William Paul
- Vicar of Orton on the Hill
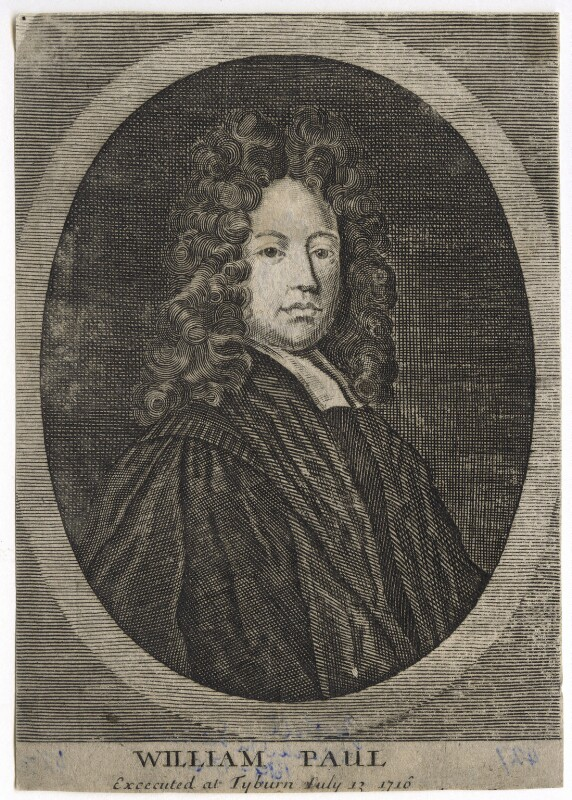
- William Paul after unknown artist, line engraving (1716 or after)
- Diocese: Leicester
- Appointed: 5 May 1709

Orders
- Ordination: c. 1705

Personal details
- Born: 1678 Lutterworth
- Died: 13 July 1716 (aged 38) Tyburn
- Denomination: Anglican
- Education: St. John's College, Cambridge

William Paul (1678–1716), Vicar of Orton, was a nonjuring Church of England clergyman and Jacobite sympathizer, executed for treason.

== Life ==
William Paul, born in 1678, was the eldest son of John Paul, who possessed the small estate of Little Ashby, near Lutterworth, Leicestershire, his mother being a daughter of Mr. Barfoot of Streatfields, Warwickshire. He received his early education at a school kept by Thomas Sargreave, rector of Leire, Leicestershire, and at Rugby, which he entered in 1696. In 1698 he went to St. John's College, Cambridge, where he graduated BA in 1701, and MA in 1705. Shortly after leaving the university he became curate at Carlton Curlieu, near Harborough, Leicestershire, acting at the same time as chaplain to Sir Geoffrey Palmer. He went thence to Tamworth, Staffordshire, where he was also usher in the free school; and subsequently became curate at Nuneaton, Warwickshire. From Nuneaton he was promoted to the vicarage of Orton on the Hill, Leicestershire, being instituted on 5 May 1709, after taking the oaths to Queen Anne and abjuring the Pretender.

On the outbreak of the rebellion in 1715 he set out with others to join the Jacobite forces in Lancashire. On the way north he was seized by Major Bradshaw, but was again set at liberty by Colonel Noel, a justice of the peace. He succeeded in joining the rebels at Lancaster, and at Preston induced Robert Patten to permit him to read the prayers. This permission, Patten affirms, he granted him unwillingly, because he was in lay dress; and he read prayers three times for the Pretender as King. He left Preston just before it was invested, and, although taken by General Wills, was discharged.

After the rout of the rebels he went south to his own county, and thence to London, where he appeared in coloured clothes, laced hat, full-bottomed wig, and a sword by his side. While in St. James's Park he was accidentally met by Thomas Bird, a justice of the peace for his county, who knew him, and took him prisoner 12 December 1715. He was carried to the Duke of Devonshire's, and thence to Lord Townshend's. After examination he was committed to a messenger's house, and fourteen days afterwards he was sent to Newgate. He was brought to the exchequer bar at Westminster 31 May 1716, when he pleaded not guilty; but when brought again to the bar 15 June he withdrew his former plea, and acknowledged his guilt. After sentence of death was passed he expressed the deepest penitence for his conduct, and wrote letters to the King, the Lord Chief Justice, and the Archbishop of Canterbury, soliciting mercy, in which he asserted that he now detested and abhorred the rebellion from the bottom of his soul. Finding, however, that these professions were ineffectual to save his life, he again entirely changed his attitude. On the scaffold he appeared in the canonical habit of the Church of England; declared that he was a true son of the church, not as it was now – schismatical – and that he died in the real nonjuring one, free from rebellion and schism. He, moreover, asked pardon of all he had scandalised by pleading guilty, and of his God and King for having violated his loyalty "by taking most abominable oaths in defence of usurpation" against his "lawful sovereign King James the third". He was hanged, drawn and quartered at Tyburn on 13 July.

A portrait of Paul has been engraved in an oval along with John Hall, who was executed on the same gallows. The engraver is supposed to have been Vertue.

== Sources ==
- A True Copy of the Papers delivered to the Sheriffs of London by William Paul, a Clergyman, and John Hall, Esq., 1716;
- The Devil's Martyrs, or Plain Dealing, in answer to the Jacobite Speeches of those two Perjured Rebels, William Paul, a Clergyman, and John Hall, a Justice of the Peace, by John Dunton, 1716;
- Last Speech of William Paul, Clergyman, who was Hang'd, Drawn, and Quarter'd, at Tyburn, on the 13th of July, 1716, for High Treason against His Majesty King George, 1716;
- Remarks on the Speeches of Wm. Paul, Clerk, and John Hall, of Otterburn, Esq. 1716.
- The Thanks of an Honest Clergyman for Mr. Paul's Speech at Tyburn, 1716;
- Patten's History of the Rebellion;
- Granger's Biographical History of England.
