= Francis Bernard (physician) =

English medical professional and astrologer

Francis Bernard FRCP
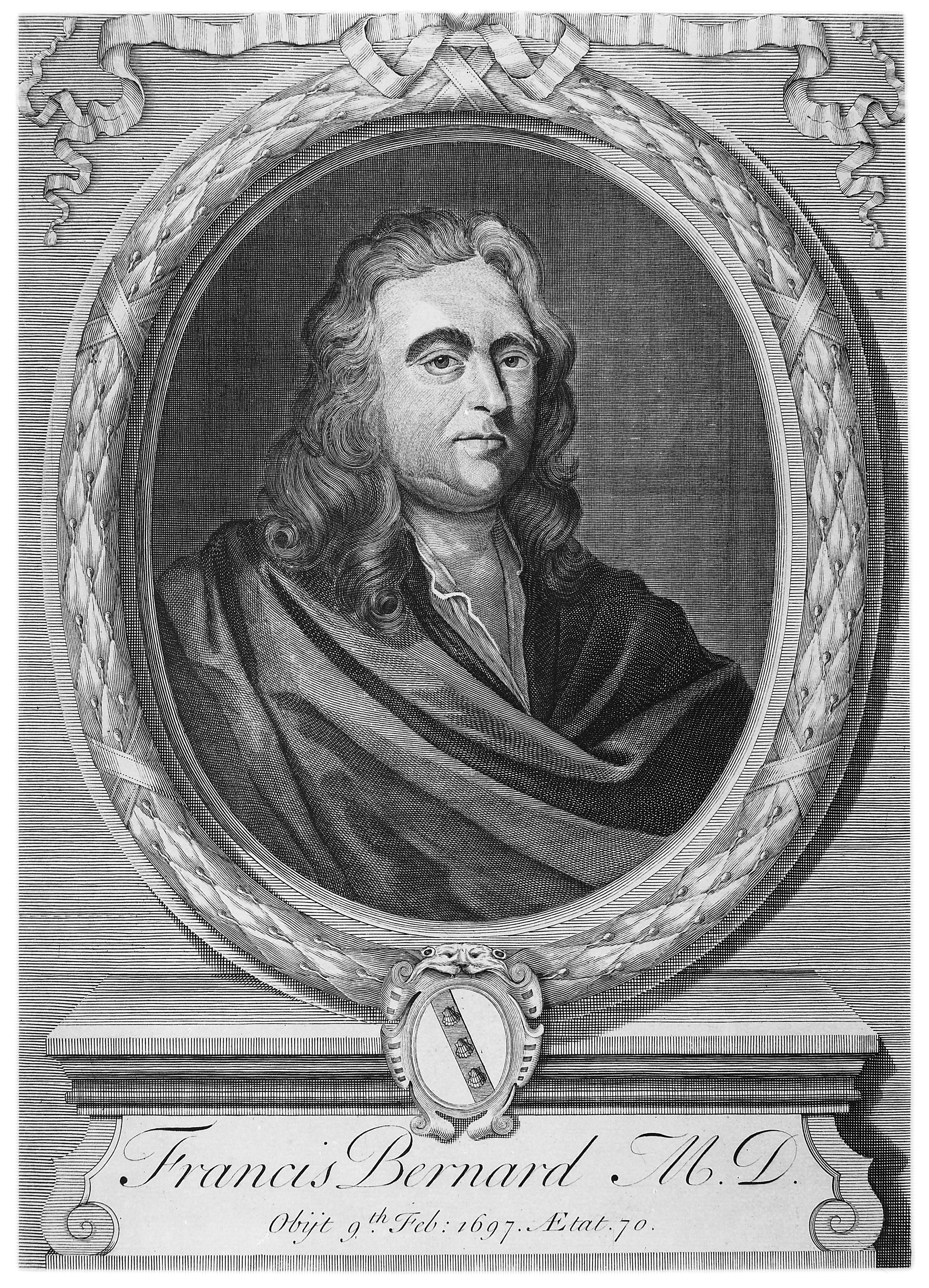
- Line engraving of Bernard by William Angus, 1817
- Born: 28 September 1628; Croydon, South London, England
- Died: 9 February 1698 (aged 69); Aldersgate, London, England
- Burial place: St Botolph's, Aldersgate
- Education: Cambridge University
- Occupations: Apothecary, astrologer, physician
- Known for: Having the largest medical library of the time
- Relatives: Charles Bernard
- Medical career
- Profession: Apothecary, physician in ordinary
- Institutions: St Bartholomew's Hospital
- Research: Astrology

Francis Bernard (bapt. 28 September 1628 – 9 February 1698) was an English apothecary, astrologer and physician, known for his large medical library.

== Life ==
He was the son of Samuel Bernard, vicar of Croydon, and his wife Elizabeth. Until later middle age he was an apothecary, made free of the Society of Apothecaries in 1653. Charles Bernard was his brother.

Bernard was incorporated M.D. at Cambridge in 1678, having received a Lambeth degree earlier in the same year from William Sancroft, Archbishop of Canterbury.

He became a fellow of the College of Physicians of London in 1687, nominated by James II's charter: he had been elected an honorary fellow seven years earlier. He was elected assistant-physician to St Bartholomew's Hospital 20 November 1678, and was appointed physician in ordinary to James II. Robert Walpole (1650–1700) was one of his patients. He was on good terms with Theophilus de Garencières.

Bernard died 9 February 1698 and a monument to him was placed in St Botolph's, Aldersgate, by his wife.

== Library ==
His house was in Little Britain, London, near St Bartholomew's Hospital, and it contained a major library. Besides the learned languages, Bernard knew French, Spanish, and Italian. The medical part of his library was reputed to be the largest collection of books on physic yet made in England. It was auctioned after his death, and much of it went to Hans Sloane. The sale was also the source for John Toland of works by Giordano Bruno. Among the Sloane manuscripts is one of Bernard's casebooks.

== Astrologer ==
Bernard was also an astrologer, who cast horoscopes in the traditional way. The nativity he gave for George Joyce survives. John Aubrey took an interest in the horoscope for Thomas Hobbes on which Bernard collaborated with John Gadbury. Bernard was lampooned as "Horoscope" in Samuel Garth's The Dispensary:

An inner Room receives the numerous shoals
Of such as pay to be reputed Fools,
Globes stand by Globes, Volumes on Volumes lie,
And Planetary schemes amuse the eye.

Bernard communicated to William Lilly in 1664 a theory on horoscopes for cities, and its application to the prediction of fires in London.

== Family ==
Bernard and his wife Anne were married around 1654.
