= Awake My Soul and with the Sun =

17th-century hymn by Thomas Ken

"Awake My Soul and with the Sun" is a 17th-century hymn by the Anglican cleric and hymnodist Thomas Ken. It was written in 1695 as a morning hymn and, latterly, it is usually sung to the tune Morning Hymn by François Hippolyte Barthélemon (1741–1808). Occasionally, it is sung to Old Hundredth. Comprising 14 verses, ordinarily only the first and last three verses are sung. In 2002/2003, English composer John Rutter integrated the first and second verse into the Kyrie of his Mass of the Children.

This hymn was written by Thomas Ken along with "All Praise to Thee, My God, This Night" (an evening hymn) and "My God, I now from Sleep Awake" (a midnight hymn). The three hymns all have the same last verse, which is now known as the Common Doxology.

The words are:

1 Awake, my soul, and with the sun
Thy daily stage of duty run;
Shake off dull sloth, and joyful rise
To pay thy morning sacrifice.

2 Redeem the misspent moments past,
And live this day as if thy last;
Improve thy talent with due care,
For the great day thyself prepare.

3 Let all thy converse be sincere,
Thy conscience as the noon-day clear:
Think how all-seeing God thy ways
And all thy secret thoughts surveys.

4 By influence of the light divine,
Let thy own light to others shine,
Reflect all heaven's propitious rays,
In ardent love, and cheerful praise.

5 Wake, and lift up thyself, my heart,
And with the angels bear thy part,
Who all night long unwearied sing
High praise to the eternal King.

6 Glory to thee, who safe hast kept
And hast refreshed me whilst I slept;
Grant, Lord, when I from death shall wake,
I may of endless light partake.

7 May I like you in God delight,
Have all day long my God in sight,
Perform like you my Maker's will,
O may I never more do ill.

8 Had I your Wings, to Heaven I'd fly,
But God shall that defect supply,
And my Soul wing’d with warm desire,
Shall all day long to Heav’n aspire.

9 All praise to Thee who safe hast kept,
And hast refresh’d me whilst I slept.
Grant Lord, when I from death shall wake,
I may of endless Light partake.

10 I would not wake, nor rise again,
And Heav’n itself I would disdain;
Were't not Thou there to be enjoy’d,
And I in Hymns to be employ’d.

11 Heav’n is, dear Lord, where e’er Thou art,
O never then from me depart;
For to my Soul, ’tis Hell to be,
But for one moment void of Thee.

12 Lord, I my vows to Thee renew,
Disperse my sins as Morning dew,
Guard my first springs of Thought and Will,
And with Thy self my Spirit fill.

13 Direct, control, suggest, this day,
All I design, or do, or say;
That all my Powers with all their might,
In Thy sole Glory may unite.

Doxology

14 Praise God, from whom all blessings flow,
Praise Him all Creatures here below,
Praise Him above ye Heavenly Host,
Praise Father, Son, and Holy Ghost.
