= William Lloyd (bishop of Norwich) =

Welsh-born Anglican bishop (1637–1710)

William Lloyd (1637 – 1 January 1710) was a Welsh-born Anglican bishop. He was deprived of his see in 1691 for being a non-juror.

== Life ==
Lloyd was born at Bala, Merionethshire, in 1637, son of Edward Lloyd, a rector at Llangower. After two years at Ruthin School, he was admitted on 23 February 1655 as a sizar at St John's College, Cambridge. He graduated BA and MA and was in 1670 created DD by royal letters.

For some time after taking his master's degree, he was chaplain to the English Merchants' Factory in Portugal and Vicar of Battersea, Surrey. He was Archdeacon of Merioneth from 1668 to 1672, then chaplain to Thomas Clifford, 1st Baron Clifford of Chudleigh and prebendary of Caddington Minor in St Paul's Cathedral from 4 May 1672 to March 1676. On 6 April 1675 he was elected Bishop of Llandaff, in succession to Francis Davies. He was the last Welshman to hold this post for 200 years.

He was transferred on 10 April 1679 to Peterborough. In 1685 he was appointed to become Bishop of Norwich. He sought to sign the petition for which the Seven Bishops were tried in 1688, but his letter was delayed; he helped them prepare their defence, which led to a threat that he should yet "keep company with them".

== Deprived ==
At the Glorious Revolution Lloyd attended a meeting of the Convention Parliament, but did not take the oaths by the date fixed. He then declined to take them, but remained in possession of his posts until 1 August 1690, when he was suspended from performing his ecclesiastical functions until 1 February 1691, then formally deprived.

In 1692 William Sancroft, the deprived archbishop, formally delegated to Lloyd as his proxy in exercising his archiepiscopal powers in spiritual matters. Lloyd signed two published letters, one A Vindication of the [nonjuring] Bishops, 1690, and another appealing to all Christian people for assistance to the suffering non-juring clergy, in July 1695. When a list of non-juring clergy was taken to James II at the Château de Saint-Germain-en-Laye, the exiled king directed Sancroft and Lloyd each to nominate one suspended clergyman for the episcopate. Lloyd nominated Thomas Wagstaffe as suffragan bishop of Ipswich and performed the consecration on 24 February 1693 at a private house, assisted by the deprived bishops of Peterborough and Ely.

Lloyd retired to Hammersmith, where he continued with caution to perform his episcopal functions. He died 1 January 1710 and was buried in the belfry of Hammersmith parish church, in accordance with his wish. He had outlived all the deprived bishops except Thomas Ken. His death was followed by the return of Henry Dodwell, Robert Nelson, Brokesby and others to the national church, Ken having expressly declared a wish for the schism to end.

== Family ==
Lloyd left a widow, Hannah. They had a son named John (BA 1694 and MA 1698 of St John's College, Cambridge), who died in 1706, a fortnight after he had married a daughter of Dr Humphrey Humphreys.

Church of England titles
Preceded by Francis Davies	Bishop of Llandaff; 1675–1679	Succeeded by William Beaw
Preceded by Joseph Henshaw	Bishop of Peterborough; 1679–1685	Succeeded by Thomas White
Preceded by Anthony Sparrow	Bishop of Norwich; 1685–1691	Succeeded by John Moore
