= John Kettlewell =

English clergyman, nonjuror and devotional writer

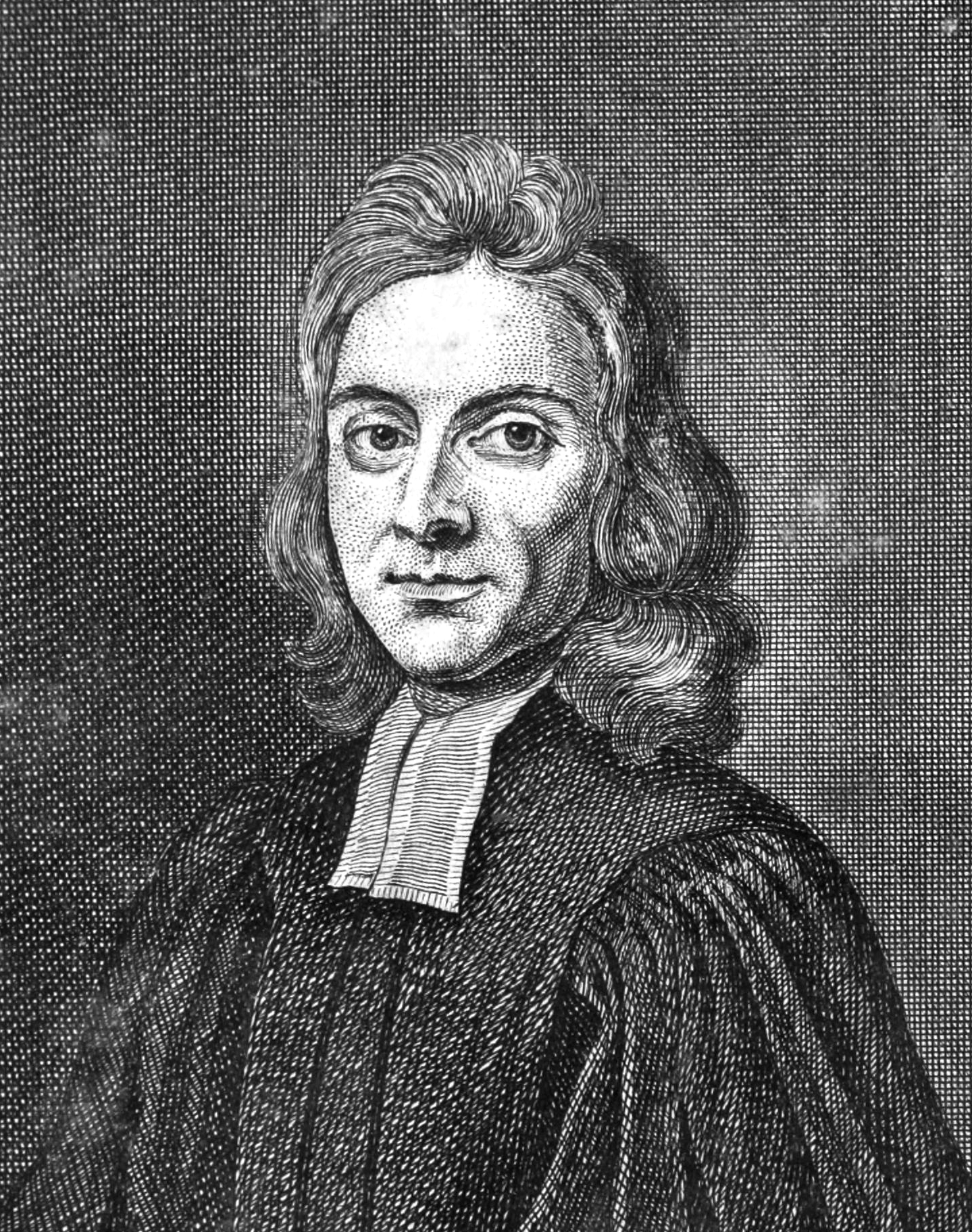
John Kettlewell, frontispiece from the 10th edition of his Help and Exhortation to Worthy Communicating

John Kettlewell (10 March 1653 – 12 April 1695) was an English clergyman, nonjuror and devotional writer. He is now known for his arguments against William Sherlock, who had justified the change of monarch of 1688–89 and his own switch of sides in The Case of the Allegiance. According to J. P. Kenyon, Kettlewell's reply made a case "with which conformist Anglicans could only agree, because it was spiritual, while Sherlock's was resolutely aspiritual". He went on to attack defenders of the Glorious Revolution generally as proponents of fallacious contractarian theories.

== Life ==
He was the second son of John Kettlewell, a merchant at Northallerton, Yorkshire, by his wife, Elizabeth Ogle, was born 10 March 1653, and was educated at Northallerton Grammar School under Thomas Smelt, a royalist, whose other pupils included George Hickes, William Palliser, Thomas Burnet, Thomas Rymer, and John Radcliffe. Kettlewell matriculated at St Edmund Hall, Oxford on 11 November 1670, and graduated B.A. 20 June 1674. On Radcliffe's resignation of a fellowship at Lincoln College, Oxford, Kettlewell was elected in his place in July 1675, with the backing of George Hickes, then himself a fellow. For about five years he acted as tutor in college, and proceeded M.A. 3 May 1677.

He was ordained deacon by John Fell in Christ Church Cathedral 10 June 1677, and priest 24 February 1678. The reputation which his first book made for him led to his appointment as chaplain to Anne, Countess of Bedford, and to his presentation by Simon Digby, 4th Baron Digby to the vicarage of Coleshill, Warwickshire (December 1682). He resigned his fellowship at Lincoln College on 22 November 1683, devoted himself to his parish, where he preached the high church doctrine of passive obedience. In 1685 Kettlewell married.

Through the Glorious Revolution he preached strongly against rebellion; he adhered consistently to this principle, and was deprived of his vicarage in 1690. He moved to London, and spent the remainder of his life, occupied in the composition of devotional books and controversial tracts. Shortly before his death he proposed to Bishop Thomas Ken the establishment of a fund for the relief of the suffering deprived clergy; and circulars asking for subscriptions were issued. However, the charitable scheme was regarded by the government as a seditious usurpation of authority, and prosecutions were instituted. Kettlewell died at his house in Gray's Inn Lane on 12 April 1695, at the age of 42. He was buried on 15 April in the church of All Hallows Barking, in the same grave in which William Laud had been interred, and was commemorated in a Latin inscription on a marble tablet erected by his widow at the east end of the church. At Kettlewell's funeral Ken officiated for the only time in public after his deprivation.

Kettlewell had married at Whitchurch, near Reading, on 4 October 1685, Jane, daughter of Anthony Lybb of Hardwick House in the parish of Whitchurch; they had no children. His papers were entrusted by his widow to Robert Nelson, who published some of them.

== Works ==
His first book, The Measures of Christian Obedience, a summary of Christian morals as involved in obedience to the laws of the Gospel, was written between Christmas 1677 and Easter 1678, but was not published until 1681, when, at Hickes's suggestion, Kettlewell dedicated it to Henry Compton, bishop of London. This dedication he suppressed after Compton had appeared in military array on behalf of the Prince of Orange. His second publication resulted from his parochial work; he was in the habit of preaching preparation-sermons before communion, eight or nine times in the year, and of these he printed a summary in 1683 under the title of An Help and Exhortation to Worthy Communicating, dedicating the book to Lord Digby. Shortly after the suppression of Monmouth's rebellion he preached a sermon, in his collected works with the title of Measures of Christian Subjection. As a supplement to his first book, that on Christian Obedience, he published in February 1687-8 his Practical Believer, which passed through many editions.

Kettlewell's works are:

- Measures of Christian Obedience, 1681; 2nd edit. 1683-1684, 3rd 1696, 4th 1700, 5th 1709 (with portrait), 6th 1714.
- Help and Exhortation to Worthy Communicating, 1683; eight editions up to 1717, the fourth printed at Cambridge in 1701.
- A Discourse explaining the Nature of Edification, in a visitation sermon at Coventry, 1684.
- A Funeral Sermon for the Lady Frances Digby, 1684.
- The Religious Loyalist; a visitation sermon at Coleshill. 1686.
- Sermon on Occasion of the Death of Simon, Lord Digby, 1686.
- The Practical Believer; or the Articles of the Apostles' Creed drawn out to form a true Christian's Heart and Practice, two parts [anon., with initials J. K.], 1688; published by William Allen, D.D., fol. 1703; 3rd edit., with a preface by Robert Nelson, and additions, 1712-13; translated into Welsh by Richard ap Robert, 1708.
- Of Christian Prudence, or Religious Wisdom, not degenerating into Irreligious Craftiness in Trying Times [anon., with initials J. K.], 1691.
- Christianity, a Doctrine of the Cross; or Passive Obedience under any pretended Invasion of Legal Rights and Liberties [anon.]. 1691; 1695, with the author's name.
- The Duty of Allegiance settled upon its True Grounds ... in Answer to a late Book of Dr. Will. Sherlock, entituled The Case of the Allegiance due to Sovereign Powers [anon.], 1691.
- Of Christian Communion, to be kept on in the Unity of Christ's Church ... and of the Obligations both of faithful Pastors to administer Orthodox and Holy Offices, and of faithful People to Communicate in the same, three parts [anon.], 1693; reissued in 1695 with a general title of Four several Tracts of the Rev. John Kettlewell, without specification of any others.
- A Companion for the Persecuted; or an Office for those who Suffer for Righteousness, 1694.
- A Companion for the Penitent and for Persons troubled in Mind, 1694; it was reissued in 1696, together with the Companion for the Persecuted dated 1693.
- Death made Comfortable, or the Way to Die well, 1695; with an office for the sick 1702, and 3rd edit. 1723.
- Declaration and Profession made by [him] at the receiving of the Holy Sacrament of the Lord's Supper, 23 March 1694; reprinted in his Life.
- Five Discourses on so many important Points of Practical Religion, with a preface giving some account of his life (by Robert Nelson), 1696; 2nd edit., with four sermons, two parts, 1708.
- An Office for Prisoners for Crimes, together with another for Prisoners for Debt (with a preface by Robert Nelson), 1697.
- 'Two Select Discourses on Faith, and the Objects Thereof, the Articles of the Apostles Creed. The First On Faith, Shewing the Nature and Difference of that Faith which is Justifying, and of That Which Is Not. The Second, The Practical Believer: Or, the Articles of the Apostles Creed, Drawn Out To Form a True Christian's Heart and Practice. Two Treatises Upon the Covenant of Grace, The First, A Discourse of the Nature, Ends, and Difference of the Two Covenants. The Second Catechetical Lectures Upon the Preliminary Questions and Answers of the Church-Catechism (Four Books In One)', 1703, with William Allen and Thomas Bray Printed by J. Brudenell for Willian Haws, 1703
- The Great Evil and Danger of Profaneness and Prodigality (published by Nelson), 1705.
- Works, 2 vols, fol. 1719, with Life prefixed; the tracts have title-pages dated 1718.
- The True Church of England Man's Companion, a manual of devotion compiled from his works, 1749.

A treatise on the new oaths was left by him in manuscript, but never printed.
