= Severn Stoke =

Village in Worcestershire, England

Coordinates: 52.095069°N 2.209898°W

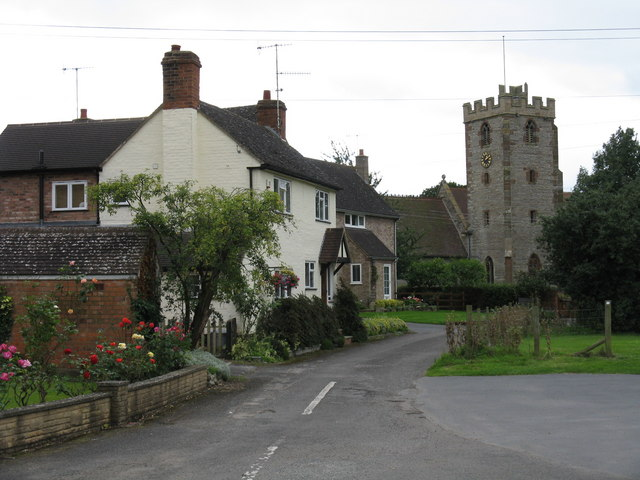
- Church and old houses

- Location within Worcestershire
- Population: 676 (2021)
- OS grid reference: SO857441
- Civil parish: Severn Stoke
- District: Malvern Hills
- Shire county: Worcestershire
- Region: West Midlands
- Country: England
- Sovereign state: United Kingdom
- Post town: WORCESTER
- Postcode district: WR8
- Police: West Mercia
- Fire: Hereford and Worcester
- Ambulance: West Midlands
- UK Parliament: West Worcestershire

Severn Stoke is an English village and civil parish in the Malvern Hills District, in the south of the county of Worcestershire, alongside the A38 trunk road. It had a population of 676 in 2021.

== History ==
In 1996 a hoard of 18 silver Saxon pennies was found near Severn Stoke.

Severn Stoke was within the bounds of the Royal forest of Horewell during the medieval period. The woodlands were mostly removed around the time of the Civil War.

Severn Stoke War Memorial at the corner of Ham Lane and Church is a Grade II listed monument in the form of a Classical obelisk in Portland stone, unveiled in 1920. It lists 14 servicemen who died in the First World War, 82 others who served abroad, and 15 who served at home.

=== Notable people ===
- Moses Browne, poet and devotional writer, born in 1704.
- Ralph Taylor, clergyman, nonjuror and sometime chaplain to the court of James II.

== Amenities ==
The village has a pub and restaurant, the Rose & Crown in Church Lane, which occupies a 15th-century half-timbered building in a garden. There is a village hall with wheelchair access in Ham Lane. The nearest shopping facilities are in Upton-upon-Severn (3 miles, 4.8 km).

The annual Croome Hunt was held around Severn Stoke and was a popular pastime for those keen to partake in fox-hunting. In 1939, members included Lord and Lady Coventry and Capt. Alan Cecil Lupton who had lived at his estate, Severn Bank, until the late 1930s. For the April 1939 event, Lord Coventry was reportedly Master of the Hunt.

== Church ==
The Anglican parish church is dedicated to St Denys. It forms part of the parish of Kempsey in the Diocese of Worcester.

The Grade II* listed church is built of grey rubble masonry throughout and dates mainly from the 14th and 15th centuries, but was restored in 1872 and 1890. The building consists of a nave with a south aisle and porch, a transept on the south side of the church, a tower on the north side, and a chancel. There are Romanesque carved fragments set into the chancel walls both inside and out, and reset into a niche on the N side of the nave; the niche has an arched head.

== Schools ==
The local primary school closed in 1986. The nearest primary schools today are at Kempsey and Upton-upon-Severn.

== Public transport ==
The village has occasional daytime buses to and from Worcester and Upton upon Severn on school days.

The nearest railway station is at Great Malvern (10 miles, 16 km away), with hourly services to Birmingham and to London Paddington, and two-hourly weekday services to Bristol Temple Meads. (Though Severn Stoke was never connected to the railway, a highly detailed 00 gauge model can be seen, based on what the station may have looked like if there had been one.)
