= Moses Browne =

English poet & clergyman (1703–1787)

Moses Browne (1703 – 13 September 1787), poet and cleric, suffers from uncertainty about the details of his birth. Some records suggest Severn Stoke in Worcestershire, but a London birth is more likely, as he became a pen-cutter in Clerkenwell, London, after the death of his patron, Lord Molesworth, in 1725. He then became a poet, and in middle age a clergyman of the Church of England.

== London life ==
Browne contributed poems to The Gentleman's Magazine, winning several prizes from its founder. Moses Browne married Ann Wibourne in 1738 in Clerkenwell. Moses and Ann had at least 11 children – some records indicate up to 13.

== Church appointments ==
Browne found success as a devotional writer, and on the instigation of the evangelical writer James Hervey, was ordained in 1753. He was then appointed Vicar of Olney, Buckinghamshire in 1753. In 1764, Browne took the additional post of Chaplain at Morden College in Blackheath, London, one reason being that his Olney post could not sustain such a large family. However, he remained a plural Vicar of Olney at the same time as Vicar of Sutton (probably Long Sutton, Lincolnshire) until his death in 1787.

== Noted works ==
1729 – Piscatory Eclogues
1742 - The Universe
1750 – The Compleat Angler
1752 – The Works and Rest of the Creation
1772 – The Excellency of the Knowledge of Jesus Christ
