= Thomas White (bishop) =

British bishop

The Right Reverend Thomas White
- Bishop of Peterborough
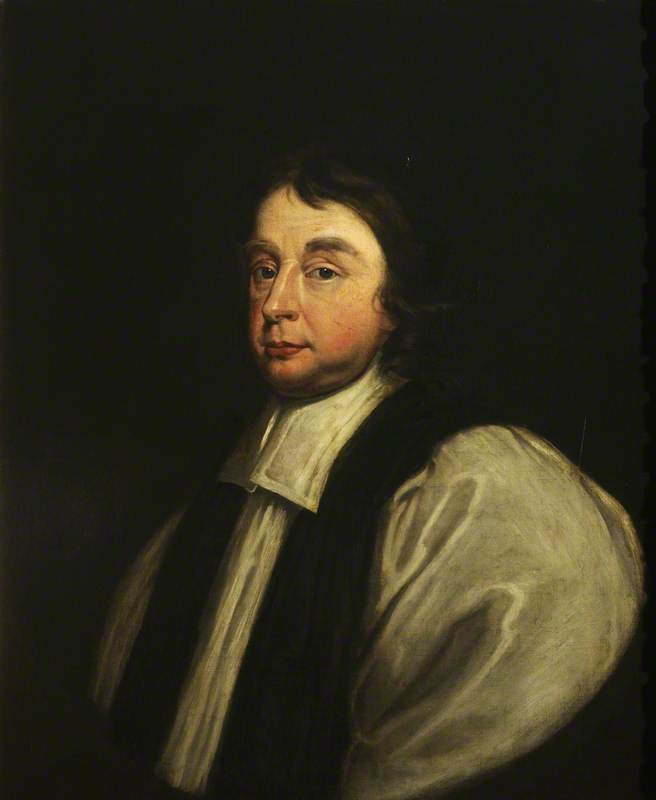
- Diocese: Diocese of Peterborough
- In office: 1685–1690
- Predecessor: William Lloyd
- Successor: Richard Cumberland

Orders
- Consecration: 25 October 1685 by William Sancroft

Personal details
- Born: 1628
- Died: 30 May 1698
- Denomination: Anglican
- Education: St John's College, Cambridge

Thomas White (1628–1698) was Bishop of Peterborough from 1685 to 1690.

== Life ==
He was educated at St John's College, Cambridge.

White held the following livings:

- Vicar of the Church of St. Mary Magdalene, Newark-on-Trent, 1660–66.
- Rector of All-Hallows-the-Great, London, 1666–79.
- Rector of St Mary the Virgin's Church, Bottesford, 1679–85.
- Archdeacon of Nottingham, 1683–85.

In 1683 White became chaplain to Princess Anne. He was appointed Bishop of Peterborough in 1685.

He was one of the seven bishops who petitioned against the declaration of Indulgence issued by James II in 1688, and with the others was tried and sensationally acquitted. Although the trial had contributed to the Glorious Revolution, he was one of the non-juring bishops, refusing to take the oath of allegiance to William III and Mary II in 1689 and so was deprived of his see in February 1690. As a non-juror, he attended Sir John Fenwick, 3rd Baronet on the scaffold prior to his execution in 1697. He died a year later.

Church of England titles
Preceded by William Lloyd	Bishop of Peterborough; 1685–1690	Succeeded by Richard Cumberland
