= Joseph Henshaw =

British bishop

- Born: 1608
- Died: 1679 (aged 70–71)
- Education: Hertford College, Oxford
- Known for: bishop of Peterborough

Joseph Henshaw (1603–1679) was bishop of Peterborough in the East of England from 1663 until his death. Henshaw was educated at London Charterhouse and Magdalen Hall of Hertford College, Oxford, receiving a B.A. in 1624 and a D.D. in 1639. He subsequently was chaplain to the Earl of Bristol and Duke of Buckingham; held benefices in Sussex; was delinquent in debts for which he had to compound for his estate in 1646. In 1660, he was precentor and dean of Chichester and dean of Windsor. From that office he ascended to bishop of Peterborough.

His Horæ Succisivæ (1631) was edited by William Barclay Turnbull for republication in 1839, and Meditations miscellaenous, holy and humane (1637); they were reprinted at Oxford in 1841. Horæ Succisivæ was also translated into Danish by the vicar at Voss Church in western Norway in the 17th century when British theological works were being distributed among Norwegian clergy.

== See also ==
- List of bishops of Peterborough
- List of Old Carthusians

Church of England titles
Preceded by Bruno Ryves	Dean of Chichester; 1660 –1663	Succeeded by Joseph Gulston
Preceded by Benjamin Laney	Bishop of Peterborough; 1663–1679	Succeeded by William Lloyd
