= Charles Bernard (surgeon) =

English surgeon

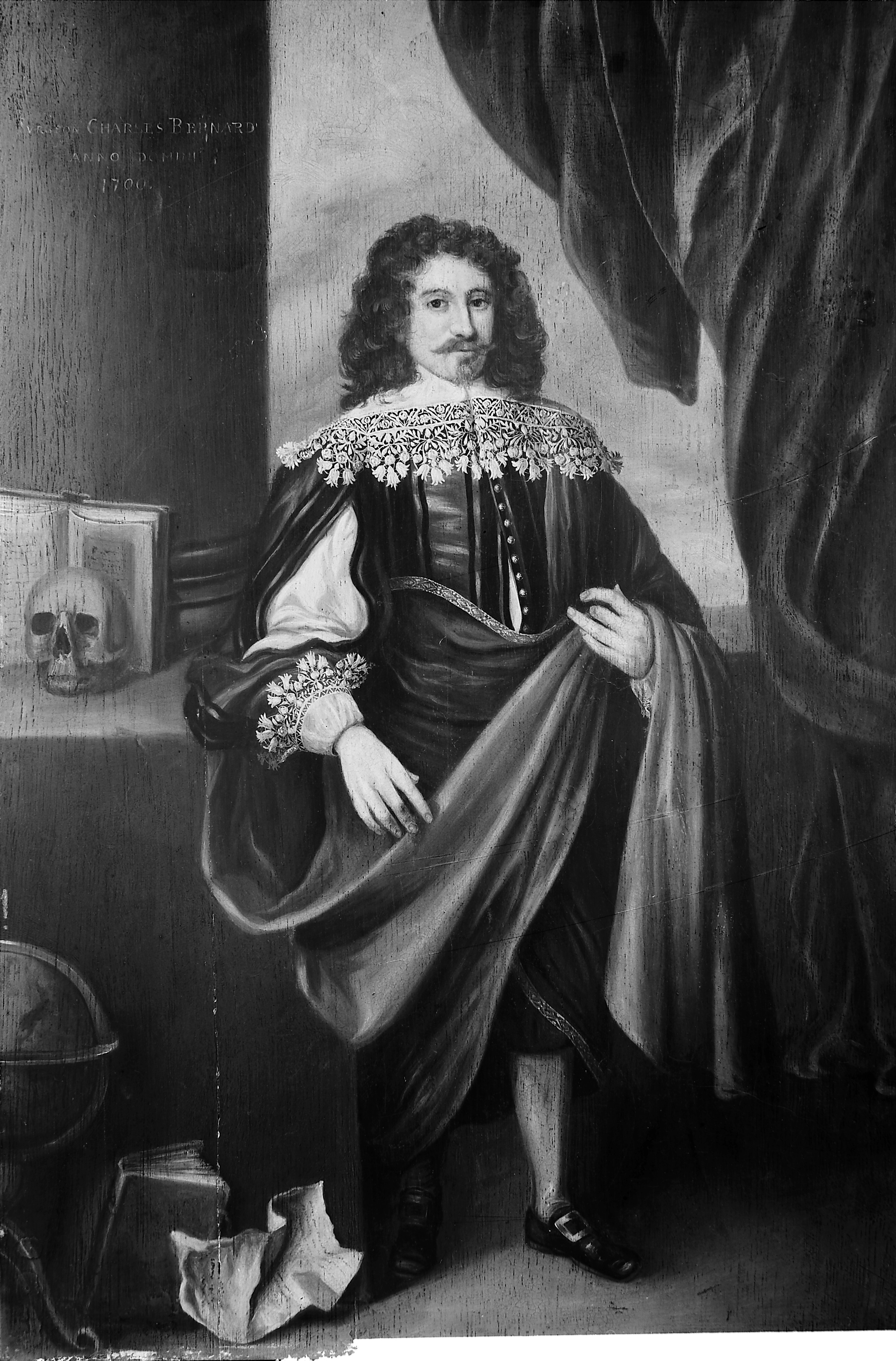
Charles Bernard

Charles Bernard (baptised 1652 – 1710) was an English surgeon, a Fellow of the Royal Society, and master of the Barber Surgeons' Company in 1703.

== Life ==
He was born at Waddon in Surrey, the son of Samuel Bernard, formerly vicar of Croydon, and his wife, Elizabeth; the physician Francis Bernard was his brother. In 1670 he was apprenticed to the surgeon Henry Boone.

Bernard, a Tory and High Churchman, was elected surgeon to St. Bartholomew's Hospital in 1686, by special command of the king. He was elected to the Royal Society in 1696. He was the chief surgical practitioner in London of his time, noted for saving the leg of a young Benjamin Hoadly, later to become Bishop of Winchester, from amputation. He became sergeant-surgeon to Queen Anne in the first year of her reign.

Bernard died at Longleat on 9 October 1710, where he was treating Thomas Thynne, 1st Viscount Weymouth. He was a bibliophile, and his library was auctioned on 22 March 1711.

== Family ==
Bernard in 1679 married Susanna Gardner, and they had a son and three daughters. Of the daughters, Elizabeth married Ambrose Dickins, apprentice to Bernard who became a physician and FRS, and another married William Wagstaffe.

== Charles Bernard Lectures ==
The first of a series of Charles Bernard Lectures, funded by the Barbers' Company, was given by Rodney Hemingfield Taylor (1942–2017) in 2001.
