= Passive obedience =

Religious and political doctrine

Passive obedience is a religious and political doctrine which states that people have a moral duty to obey the law and, in particular, to accept punishment as part of this obedience.

== George Berkeley ==
The most notable publication describing this doctrine was Bishop George Berkeley's treatise Passive Obedience; or, the Christian Doctrine of Not Resisting the Supreme Power (1712). The tract is considered Berkeley's major contribution to moral and political philosophy.

In Passive Obedience, Berkeley defends the thesis that people have "a moral duty to observe the negative precepts (prohibitions) of the law, including the duty not to resist the execution of punishment." However, Berkeley does allow that people can obey different supreme authorities if there are multiple claims to the highest authority (§52). On the other hand, Berkeley also insists that disobedience to a tyrant remains wrong, even when the tyrant's violation of moral law is a worse violation than rebellion would be; when such immoral tyranny becomes insufferable, rebellion is predictable, and violates no rights of the tyrant, yet may still violate moral law (§44). In some places, Berkeley's argument for blind obedience to a de facto authority resembles Thomas Hobbes's argument in Leviathan (1651) that rebellion can lead to anarchic violence and chaos which is worse than the worst tyranny (§§16, 47, 51), although Berkeley disagrees with Hobbes's idea that moral and political obligation ultimately rests on the law of self-preservation (§33).

== Other uses ==
In the Protestant branch of Calvinism, salvation depends on Christ's active obedience, obeying the laws and commands of God, and passive obedience, enduring the punishment of the crucifixion and suffering all the just penalties due to men for their sins. The 1658 Savoy Declaration said "11.1 Those whom God effectually calleth he also freely justifieth ... by imputing Christ’s active obedience to the whole law, and passive obedience in his death for their whole and sole righteousness, ..." The two are seen as distinct but inseparable; passive obedience on its own only takes men back to the state of Adam before the Fall. Reformed theologian, Louis Berkhof helpfully wrote: "His active obedience consists in all that He did to observe the law in behalf of sinners, as a condition for obtaining eternal life; and His passive obedience in all that He suffered in paying the penalty of sin and thus discharging the debt of all his people."(Manual of Christian Doctrine 215)

The Scottish theologian John Cameron's support for passive obedience at the start of the 17th century meant that he was principal of the University of Glasgow for less than a year in 1622.

At a human level a similar contrast distinguished between actively obeying the de facto power and law even when it conflicted with God's law or laws of nature, and passively obeying (not resisting) when it came to punishment for not actively obeying.

It was usually associated with the seventeenth-century Church of England and the Scottish Episcopal Church of the seventeenth and eighteenth centuries, and was central to the ideology of the Tory Party and the Jacobites. It is most generally seen in reference to Tory opposition to the Glorious Revolution, which saw Parliamentary determination of the succession of the English crown against primogeniture and the wishes of James II.

Passive obedience appears twice in Victor Hugo's Les Misérables, first as a scene heading "The Heroism of Passive Obedience" when the bishop entertains Valjean, and later in the text on the impact of armies when describing French intervention in Spain in 1823.

During his coup d'état of 2 December 1851, the then French president Louis-Napoléon Bonaparte reminded officers and soldiers of their pledge and duty of passive obedience to his orders as chief of the government, since he individually was responsible to the French people and posterity.
