= Nonjuring schism =

British church schisms after 1688

The Nonjuring schism refers to a split in the established churches of England, Scotland and Ireland, following the deposition and exile of James II and VII in the 1688 Glorious Revolution. As a condition of office, clergy were required to swear allegiance to the ruling monarch; for various reasons, some refused to take the oath to his successors, William III and II and Mary II. These individuals were referred to as non-jurors or as non-juring, from the Latin verb iūrāre or jūrāre, meaning "to swear an oath".

In the Church of England, an estimated 2% of priests refused to swear allegiance in 1689, including nine bishops. Ordinary clergy were allowed to keep their positions but after efforts to compromise failed, the six surviving bishops were removed in 1691. The schismatic Non-Juror Church was formed in 1693 when Bishop William Lloyd appointed his own bishops. His action was opposed by the majority of English Non-Jurors, who remained within the Church of England and are sometimes referred to as "crypto-Non-Jurors". Never large in numbers, the Non-Juror Church rapidly declined after 1715, although minor congregations remained in existence until the 1770s.

In Scotland, the 1690 religious settlement removed High Church practices and Episcopal bishops, and restored a Presbyterian-structured Church of Scotland, popularly known as the Kirk. Those ministers who refused to accept these changes were expelled, leading to a divide recognised by the Scottish Episcopalians Act 1711, which created a separate Scottish Episcopal Church. When George I became king in 1714, most Scottish Episcopalians refused to swear allegiance to the Hanoverian regime, creating a split that lasted until the death of Charles Edward Stuart in 1788.

The Non-Juring movement in the Church of Ireland was insignificant, although it produced the Jacobite propagandist Charles Leslie. The Episcopal church in North America was then part of the Church of England, but largely unaffected until after the American Revolution when the Scottish non-juror liturgy influenced that of the new U.S. Episcopal Church.

== Origins ==
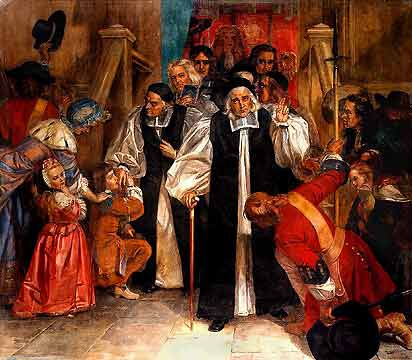
The Seven Bishops, June 1688; their acquittal was a key factor in the removal of King James II, but five became Non-Jurors out of conscience

In modern usage, Presbyterian and Episcopalian implies differences in both governance and doctrine but this was not the case in the 17th and 18th centuries. Episcopalian structures were governed by bishops, appointed by the monarch; Presbyterian implied rule by Elders, nominated by congregations. In an era when "true religion" and "true government" were assumed to be the same thing, arguments over church governance and practice often reflected political differences, not simply religious ones.

In 1688, all three established churches were Episcopalian in structure and Protestant in doctrine, but faced different challenges. In England, over 90% belonged to the Church of England, while the majority of those excluded were Protestant Nonconformists who wanted to reverse the Act of Uniformity 1662 and be allowed to rejoin the Church. In Ireland, over 75% of the population were Catholic, while the Church of Ireland was a minority even among Irish Protestants, the majority of whom were Nonconformists concentrated in Ulster. Nearly 98% of Scots were members of the Church of Scotland, or kirk, far closer in doctrine to Irish Nonconformists than the Church of England and an organisational hybrid, with bishops presiding over Presbyterian structures.

James became king in 1685 with widespread support in all three kingdoms but this changed when his policies seemed to move beyond tolerance for Catholicism and into an attack on the established church. The 1638 to 1652 Wars of the Three Kingdoms highlighted the dangers of religious division and moderates on both sides wanted to avoid a schism. Many supported James in 1685 from fear of civil war if he were bypassed; by 1688, it seemed only his deposition could prevent one. His prosecution of the Seven Bishops for seditious libel in June 1688 alienated the Tories who formed his main English support base. Many viewed this as a violation of his coronation oath promising to maintain the primacy of the Church of England, making compliance with oaths a key issue.

== English Non-Juring movement ==
"Nonjuror" generally means those who refused to take the Oath of Allegiance to the new monarchs, William III and Mary II. It includes "Non-Abjurors", those who refused to swear the Oath of Abjuration in 1701 and 1714, requiring them to deny the Stuart claim. Nine bishops became nonjurors, including Archbishop of Canterbury William Sancroft and five of the seven bishops prosecuted by James in June 1688. (Note: Church of England bishops who became Non-Jurors; William Sancroft, Thomas Ken, John Lake, Francis Turner, Thomas White, Thomas Cartwright, Robert Frampton, William Lloyd and William Thomas) One study estimates that 339 members of the clergy became nonjurors, around 2% of the total; of these, 80 subsequently conformed, offset by another 130 who refused the Oath of Abjuration in either 1701 or 1714. This ignores natural decline, so the actual number at any time would have been lower, while the majority were concentrated in areas like London and Newcastle, implying large parts of England were untouched by the controversy.

Identifying lay members is more complex, since only those holding a public office were required to swear. One source identifies a total of 584 clergy, schoolmasters and university dons as Non Jurors, but this almost certainly understates their numbers. The reasons for non-compliance varied; some, like Bishop Thomas Ken, considered themselves bound by their oath to James, but did not oppose the new government and continued to attend church services. Others argued the new regime was illegitimate, since divine right and inheritance meant kings could not be removed, the so-called "state point". A more fundamental issue was the 'church point', the belief Parliament had no right to intervene in ecclesiastical affairs, whether appointing or removing bishops and clergy, or changes to church policies.

=== History ===
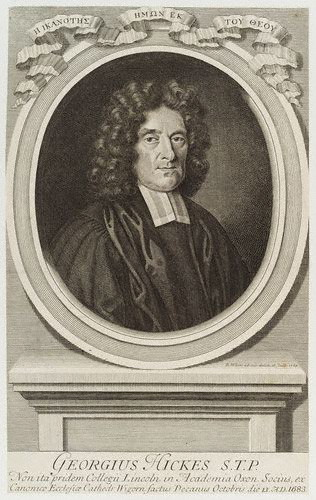
Non Juror bishop George Hickes (1642–1715), the driving force behind the schismatic Non Juror church

Regular clergy were largely undisturbed and although the nonjuring bishops were suspended in February 1690, William kept them in office as he tried to negotiate a compromise. When this failed, in May 1691 Parliament appointed six new bishops, three of the original nine having since died. In May 1692, Sancroft delegated his powers to Bishop Lloyd, who in May 1693 appointed Thomas Wagstaffe (1645–1712) and George Hickes (1642–1715) as new Non-Juring bishops. Lloyd argued he simply wanted to establish the principle Parliament had no right to deprive or appoint bishops, but it created a formal schism; the vast majority remained within the established church, while Wagstaffe refused to exercise his powers.

Some prominent nonjurors returned to the church in 1710, including Henry Dodwell (1641–1711), and Robert Nelson (1656–1715). Hickes, whose hardline views on divine right and the primacy of Stuart authority led to his appointment as Charles II's chaplain in 1683, was the main driver behind the nonjuror church; it sharply declined after his death in 1715. The death of Thomas Wagstaffe in October 1712 left Hickes as the last surviving Non-Juring bishop. To ensure the survival of the church, Hickes and two bishops from the Scottish Episcopalian Church, Archibald Campbell and James Gadderar, consecrated Jeremy Collier, Nathaniel Spinckes and Samuel Hawes as bishops in June 1713.

In 1719, the nonjuror church split into "Usager" and "Non-Usager" factions, with both sides consecrating their own bishops. Effectively, Non-Usagers wanted an eventual reconciliation with the main Church of England, while Usagers wanted to restore traditional liturgies, including use of the 1549 Book of Common Prayer. In 1716, the Usagers initiated discussions with the Greek Orthodox Church on union, which continued until 1725 before both sides admitted failure. Despite the two factions agreeing to re-unite in 1732, divisions continued with a Usager contingent led by Bishop Archibald Campbell and a small London-based Non-Usager grouping under Bishop John Blackbourne.

By the early 1740s, significant Non-Juring congregations were restricted to Newcastle, London and Manchester. In 1741, Robert Gordon became the last regular Non-Juring bishop, his consecration being agreed by the de jure James III; he died in 1779 and his congregation in London was absorbed by the Scottish Episcopal church. This left a small congregation in Holborn, which was strongly Jacobite and in 1788 refused to acknowledge George III, before disappearing in the 1790s. Bishop Campbell was succeeded by the Usager Thomas Deacon, who led a separate group in Manchester known as the Orthodox British Church, or "OBC". It strayed further away from the Church of England, investigating primitive liturgies and insisting on no State control and was Jacobite in sympathy; several members, including three of Deacon's sons, joined the Manchester Regiment that participated in the 1745 Rising. The OBC limped on into the early nineteenth century, but was wound up within a decade after the death of Bishop William Cartwright of Shrewsbury in 1799. There are suggestions elements of its theology resurfaced in the 1830s Oxford Movement.

=== Numbers and significance ===
Membership of the schismatic church was initially confined to clerics, then later expanded into the lay population. Largely restricted to urban areas, its congregations continually shifted, making it difficult to assess numbers; it is suggested these were negligible, certainly fewer than Catholics, who were around 1% of the population. Many more were so-called 'crypto-Non Jurors', those who remained with the established church after 1693, but shared some Non Juror concerns; while sympathetic to the Stuarts, only a few were active Jacobites. Typical of this High Church, Tory group was Lady Elizabeth Hastings, daughter of the Earl of Huntingdon, a Stuart loyalist. Their support was based on the 'church point', and they opposed measures seen as diminishing the primacy of the Church of England. These included the 1689 Toleration Act, and 'occasional conformity', allowing Catholics and Nonconformists limited freedom of worship.

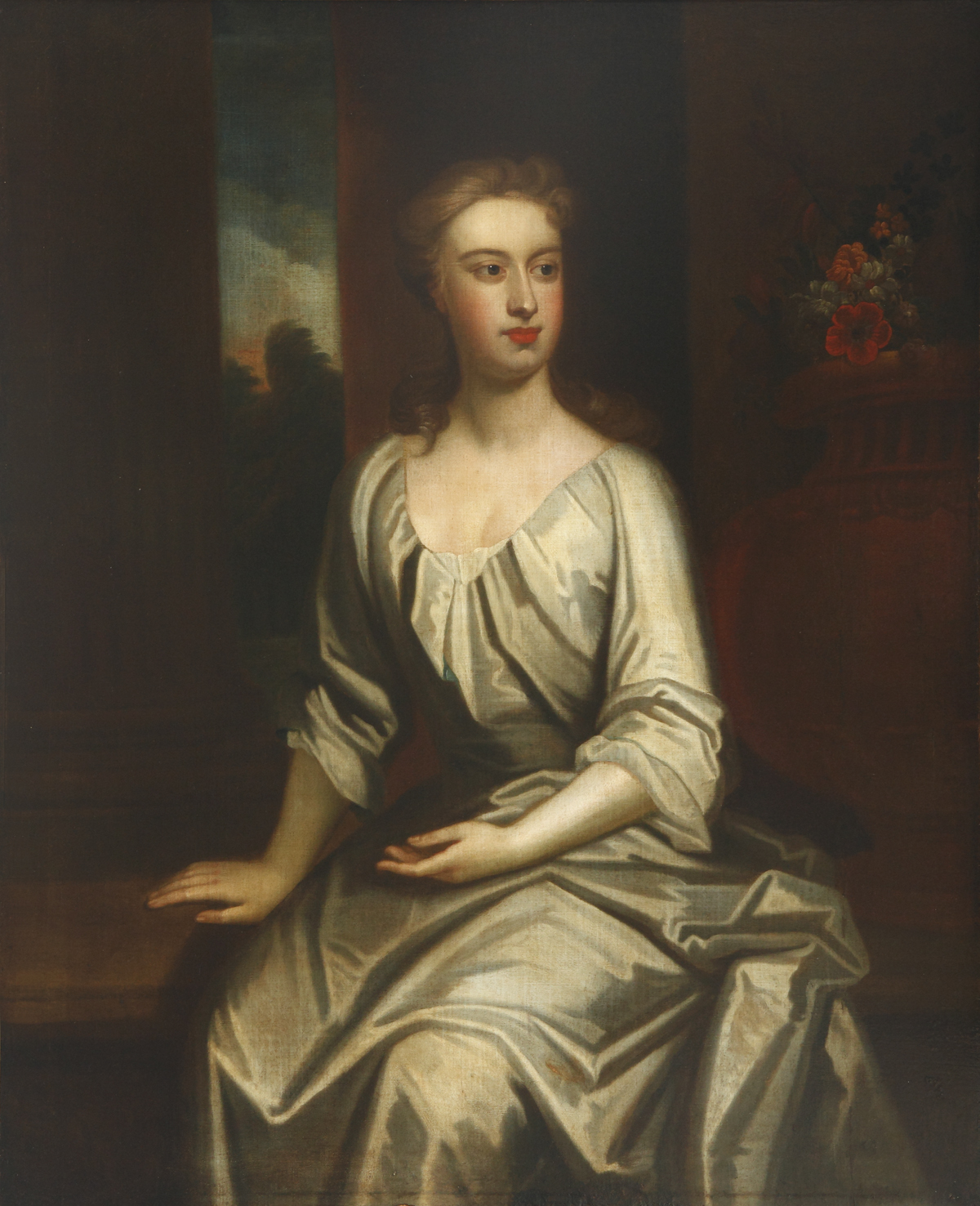
Lady Elizabeth Hastings, typical of the High Church Tories associated with the Non Jurors, whose influence was far greater than their numbers

As a result, Stuart Catholicism was an insuperable barrier to their restoration, although attempts were made to convert James and his successors; when Prince Charles visited London in 1750, he was inducted into the Non-Juring church, probably by Bishop Robert Gordon. (Note: He later returned to the Catholic church) Despite their limited numbers, Non Juror clergy exercised significant influence over church policy. Many opposed post 1689 changes that moved the Church of England away from Laudian principles of authority, and allowed greater tolerance of different practices. This led to demands for Convocation, or church assembly, to have a greater say over policy; it is suggested this was a contest between a largely Tory, High Church clerical body, and Whig bishops. Francis Atterbury, later associated with a 1722 Jacobite plot, was a prominent supporter of Convocation, although not a Non Juror himself.

Outside politics, the Non Juror movement had an impact far greater than often appreciated, which continues today. Lady Elizabeth was part of a network of wealthy High Church philanthropists, linked by Non-Jurors like Robert Nelson, who supported measures intended to eliminate 'un-Christian behaviour', such as the conversion of Catholics and Nonconformists. In 1698, they established the Society for Promoting Christian Knowledge, or SPCK, followed in 1701 by the Society for the Propagation of the Gospel in Foreign Parts, or SPG, which are still in existence. Its members included academics like Joseph Smith, who was a close advisor to Lady Elizabeth, and was well known for converting English Catholics. In 1701, the SPG sent George Keith to New Jersey, charged with converting Quakers.

Some later became early advocates of Methodism, which began as a reform movement within the Church of England. One of these was Lady Elizabeth Hastings' daughter-in-law, Selina Hastings (1707–1791), founder of the evangelical Methodist sect known as the Countess of Huntingdon's Connexion. Methodists were often accused of Jacobitism, because they rejected existing structures and practices; conversely, many "Jacobite" demonstrations during the 1730s were led by Tories hostile to the Welsh Methodist revival. Although associated with social conservatism, crypto Non-Jurors included Mary Astell (1666–1731), an educationalist sometimes called the first English feminist. Daughter of a wealthy, upper-class Non-Juror merchant, in 1709, she set up a girls' school in Chelsea, London. Supported by the SPCK, Nelson, Dodwell, Lady Elizabeth and Lady Catherine Jones, it is thought to be the first in England with an all-women Board of Governors.

== Irish Non-Juring movement ==
The Church of Ireland was a minority, even among Irish Protestants, and during the 1689 Parliament called by James, four bishops sat in the Lords, with Anthony Dopping, Bishop of Meath acting as leader of the opposition. Non Juror Henry Dodwell was born and educated in Ireland, but spent his career in England, making William Sheridan, Bishop of Kilmore and Ardagh the most significant Irish Non Juror. Son of a Catholic convert, he lost office as a result, and later died in poverty in London. Only a handful of Irish clergy followed his example, the most notable being Jacobite propagandist Charles Leslie.

As in England, many sympathised with aspects of Non Juror policy; John Pooley, Bishop of Raphoe, avoided taking the Oath of Abjuration until 1710, while Bishop Palliser was a long time correspondent of Dodwell and Non Juror historian Thomas Smith. Bishop Lindsay, later Archbishop of Armagh, was a close friend of Jacobite plotter Francis Atterbury, and himself accused of Jacobitism in 1714. However, most of these links appear to have been driven by friendship, rather than political belief.

== Scottish Non Jurors and the Scottish Episcopal Church ==
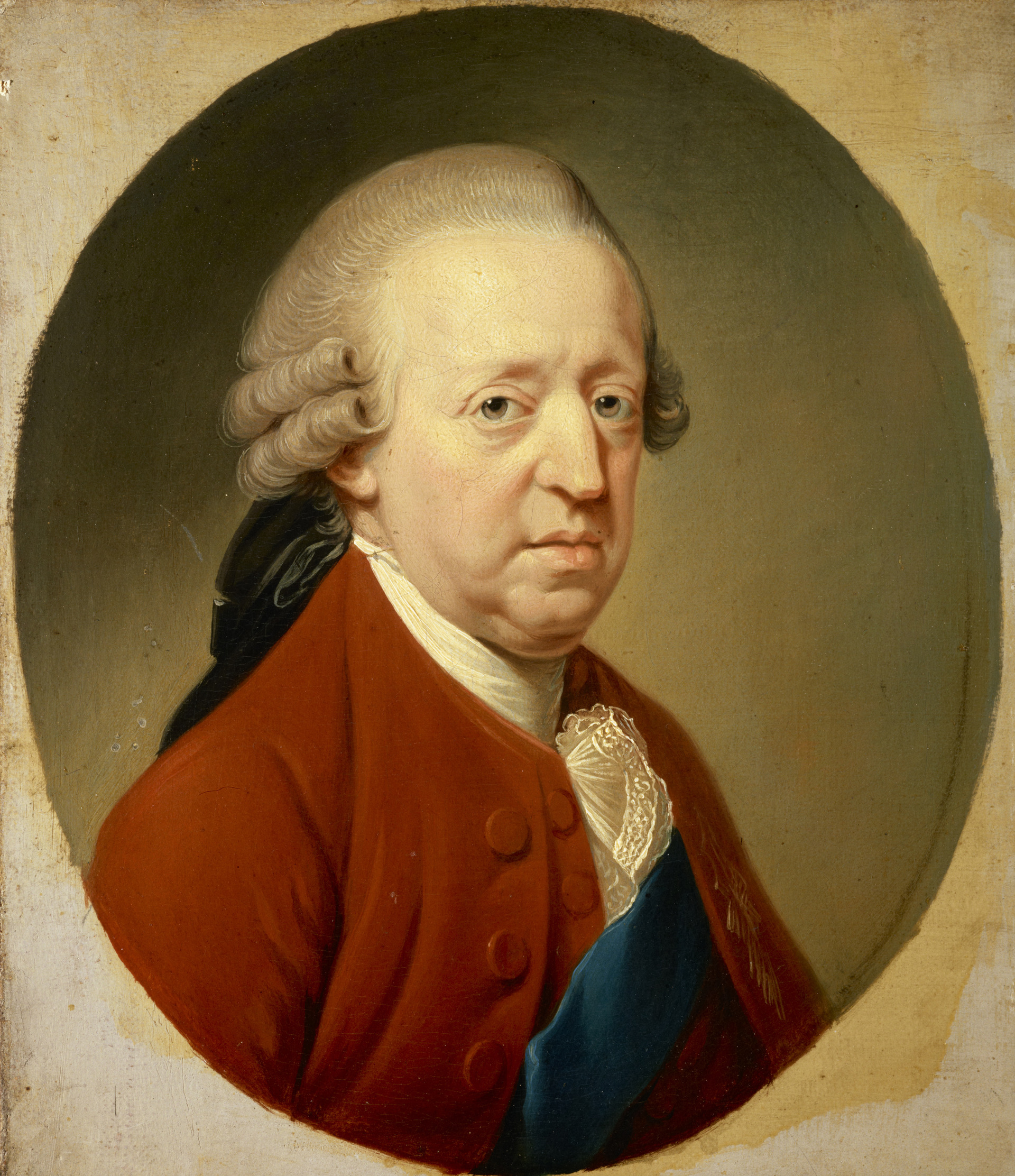
Charles Edward Stuart; after his death in 1788, the Scottish Episcopal Church ended the schism by taking the Oath to George III

English Non Juring was largely a split within Episcopalianism, but this was not the case in Scotland, where the religious conflicts of the 17th century normalised the eviction of defeated opponents. In 1688, Scots were divided roughly equally into Presbyterians and Episcopalians, the latter concentrated in the Highlands, Banffshire, Perthshire, Angus and Aberdeenshire. The 1690 General Assembly of the Church of Scotland abolished bishops and expelled 200 ministers who refused to accept these changes.

As in England, many remained in place; Michael Fraser served as minister of Daviot and Dunlichty continuously from 1673 to 1726, despite being evicted in 1694 and joining both the 1715 and 1719 Risings. Moderates within the kirk facilitated the readmission of deprived ministers; from 1690 to 1693, 70 of the 200 returned after taking the Oath of Allegiance, plus another 116 after the 1695 Act of Toleration. In 1702, a contemporary estimated 200 of 796 parishes were held by Episcopalian ministers, but the numbers above suggest many were not Non Jurors.

Before 1690, differences were largely about governance, but as they dwindled in numbers, Scottish Episcopalians increasingly focused on doctrine. They saw the 1707 Union as an opportunity to regain power via a unified British church, and began using English liturgy to help this process. The Scottish Episcopalians Act 1711 (10 Ann. c. 10) gave a legal basis for the Scottish Episcopal Church, while the Toleration Act 1711 (10 Ann. c. 6) provided legal protection for use of the Book of Common Prayer, whose rejection in 1637 had sparked the Bishops' Wars.

When George I succeeded Queen Anne in 1714, the church split into a majority Non-Juror element and Qualified Chapels, those willing to swear allegiance to the Hanoverian regime. Non-Juring Episcopalianism became a mark of Jacobite commitment and a high percentage of both Lowlanders and Highlanders who participated in the 1745 Rising came from this element of Scottish society.

Post 1745, many Non-Juror meeting houses were closed or destroyed, and further restrictions placed on their clergy and congregants. When Prince Charles died in 1788, he was succeeded by his brother Henry, a Catholic cardinal, and the Episcopal Church now swore allegiance to George III, ending the schism with the Qualified Chapels, although the Qualified Chapel in Montrose remained independent until 1920. In 1788 Bishop Charles Rose of Dunblane, and one presbyter, James Brown of Montrose, refused to acknowledge George III and his family, forming a breakaway nonjuring church based in Edinburgh that acknowledged Henry Stuart. However, the church finally ended in 1808 with the death of their last clergyman Donald Macintosh, a noted Gaelic scholar. When the penal laws were finally lifted in 1792, the Church had fewer than 15,000 members, less than one percent of the Scottish population. Today, the Scottish Episcopal Church is sometimes pejoratively referred to as the "English Kirk".

== Non Jurors in North America ==
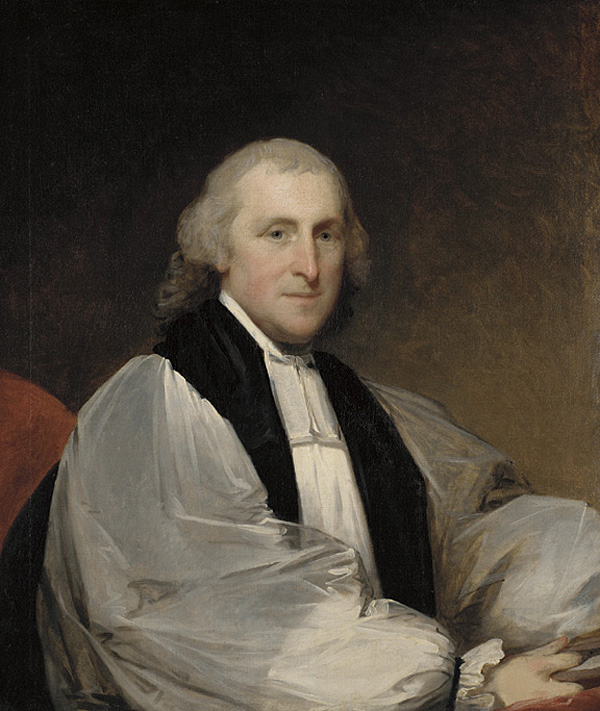
William White, appointed Episcopalian bishop of Pennsylvania in 1787

The political conflicts of the 1688 Glorious Revolution were reflected to a lesser degree in British North America and the Caribbean. The proximity of Catholic New France meant limited sympathy for James; in 1700, New York banned Catholic priests from the state. However, Virginia removed several Non Jurors from office in 1691.

Richard Welton became a Non Juror in 1714, losing his parish in Whitechapel as a result; in 1724, he was ordained a bishop by Non-Usager Ralph Taylor, and moved to North America. He replaced John Urmiston as Rector of Christ Church, Philadelphia; Urmiston demanded he be reinstated, and the dispute drew in John Talbot, rector of St. Mary's Episcopal Church, Burlington, New Jersey since April 1704.

Episcopalian ministers were in short supply in North America, one reason being delays caused by the need for London to approve appointments; between 1712 and 1720, Talbot presented numerous petitions requesting the appointment of a bishop. On a visit to England in 1722, Taylor made him a Non Juror bishop, and when Pennsylvania Governor Sir William Keith informed the church authorities, Talbot and Welton were suspended. Talbot remained in North America, where he died in 1727; Welton returned to England in 1726, dying shortly afterwards in Portugal.

Failure to establish a colonial episcopate was partly due to opposition by American Nonconformists; combined with the activities of the SPG, they viewed it as an attempt to impose a state church. In 1815, John Adams claimed a key element in mobilising popular support for the 1773 American Revolution was the "apprehension of Episcopacy".

After the outbreak of the Revolution, many Episcopal ministers remained loyal to the London government, and were removed. In Pennsylvania, most supported the Patriots, including William White, who set out principles establishing the American Episcopal Church. These were accepted by all the states, apart from Connecticut, which insisted each state must be controlled by its own bishop.

Connecticut sent Loyalist Samuel Seabury to England to be made a bishop, but since he could not take the required Oath of Allegiance to George III, he was consecrated instead by the Scottish church in November 1784. Concerned at the prospect of another schism, Parliament agreed to waive the oath, and on 4 February 1787, White was consecrated bishop of Pennsylvania by the archbishop of Canterbury, John Moore.

== Prominent Nonjurors ==
- Hilkiah Bedford (1663–1724), chaplain to Bishop Ken, author of Vindication of the Church of England (1710)
- John Blackbourne (1681–1741), Non-Usager Bishop
- Charles Booth (d. c. 1810), last consecrated irregular nonjuring bishop
- William Bowyer the Younger (1699–1777), "the learned printer"
- Thomas Brett (1667–1743), of Spring Garden, liturgical scholar, Nonjuring bishop
- Archibald Campbell (d. 1744), Scottish bishop, usager bishop, author of The Middle State
- William Cartwright (1730–99), Nonjuring Bishop in Shrewsbury
- Jeremy Collier (1650–1726), Nonjuring primus, ecclesiastical historian, writer, and critic
- Thomas Deacon (1697–1753), stepson of Jeremy Collier, liturgical scholar, bishop of Manchester;
- Henry Dodwell (1641–1711), Anglo-Irish patristic scholar, Oxford don, author of The Case in View
- Elijah Fenton (1683–1730), poet
- Robert Forbes (1708–1775), Bishop of Ross and Caithness and historian of the Jacobite Rising of 1745
- Marmaduke Fothergill (1652–1731), Vicar of Skipwith and antiquarian
- Henry Gandy (1649–1734), bishop in Non-Usager succession
- Thomas Garnett (d. 1818), of Manchester, bishop in irregular usager line
- Robert Gordon (1703–1779), last bishop in the regular Nonjuring succession. Also called Gordoun.
- Lady Elizabeth Hastings (1682–1739); philanthropist, early supporter of Methodism
- Thomas Hearne (1678–1735), antiquarian and diarist
- Charles Jennens (1700–73), librettist for Handel's Messiah, Saul, Belshazzar, and other oratorios
- William Law (1686–1761)
- Charles Leslie (1650–1721), Jacobite propagandist, author of The Rehearsal and Short and Easy Method with the Deists
- Robert Nelson (1656–1715), founding member of the Society for the Propagation of Christian Knowledge;
- Samuel Pepys (1633–1703), Secretary to the Admiralty under Charles II and James II, diarist.
- Thomas Podmore (1705–84), nonjuring Deacon in Shrewsbury. Author of 'The Layman's Apology etc.'
- Joseph Smith (1670–1756), Provost of The Queen's College, Oxford
- Thomas Smith (1638–1710), historian and librarian
- Richard Rawlinson (1690–1755) clergyman, book collector, antiquarian, and nonjuring bishop
- Ralph Taylor (1647–1722), nonjuring bishop in Non-Usager line
- John Urry (1666–1715), literary scholar, editor of Chaucer
- Thomas Wagstaffe the Elder (1645–1712), nonjuring bishop and vindicator of Charles I
- Thomas Wagstaffe the Younger (1692–1770), usager controversialist, later Anglican Chaplain at the Stuart court in Rome

== Sources ==
- Bertie, David M, ed. (2000). Scottish Episcopal Clergy 1689–2000. T & T Clark. ISBN 978-0567087461.
- Cornwall, Robert D (2008). "Wagstaffe, Thomas (1645". Oxford Dictionary of National Biography (online ed.). Oxford University Press. doi:10.1093/ref:odnb/28400. (Subscription, Wikipedia Library access or UK public library membership required.)
- Cornwall, Robert (2004). "Welton, Richard (1671/1672-1726)". Oxford Dictionary of National Biography (online ed.). Oxford University Press. doi:10.1093/ref:odnb/29031. (Subscription, Wikipedia Library access or UK public library membership required.)
- Doyle, Thomas (1997). "Jacobitism, Catholicism and the Irish Protestant Elite, 1700–1710". Eighteenth-Century Ireland / Iris an Dá Chultúr. 12: 28–59. doi:10.3828/eci.1997.4. JSTOR 30071383. S2CID 256147597.
- Duncan, Robert William (1973). "A Study of the Ministry of John Talbot in New Jersey, 1702-1727: On 'Great Ripeness' Much Dedication, and Regrettable Failure". Historical Magazine of the Protestant Episcopal Church. 42 (3): 233–256. JSTOR 42973381.
- Dickinson, HT, ed. (2006). Eighteenth Century Britain (Blackwell Companions to British History). John Wiley & Sons. ISBN 1405149639.
- Flaningam, John (1977). "The Occasional Conformity Controversy: Ideology and Party Politics, 1697-1711". Journal of British Studies. 17 (1): 38–62. doi:10.1086/385711. S2CID 143833517.
- Frace, Ryan K (2008). "Religious Toleration in the Wake of Revolution: Scotland on the Eve of Enlightenment (1688–1710s)". History. 93 (3): 355–375. doi:10.1111/j.1468-229X.2008.00429.x. JSTOR 24428394.
- Harmsen, Theodor (2008). "Hickes, George (1642–1715)". Oxford Dictionary of National Biography (online ed.). Oxford University Press. doi:10.1093/ref:odnb/13203. (Subscription, Wikipedia Library access or UK public library membership required.)
- Harris, Tim (2007). Revolution; the Great Crisis of the British Monarchy 1685–1720. Penguin. ISBN 978-0141016528.
- Hastings, James (1917). Encyclopedia of Religion and Ethics; Volume IX. T & T Clark.
- Higgins, Ian (2014). MacInnes, Alan; Graham, Lesley; German, Kieran (eds.). Jonathan Swift's Memoirs of a Jacobite in Living with Jacobitism, 1690–1788: The Three Kingdoms and Beyond. Routledge. ISBN 978-1848934702.
- Laurence, Anne (2010). "Lady Betty Hastings (1682–1739): godly patron" (PDF). Women's History Review. 19 (2): 201–213. doi:10.1080/09612021003633911. S2CID 145687985.
- Lenman, Bruce (1980). The Jacobite Risings in Britain 1689–1746. Methuen Publishing. ISBN 978-0413396501.
- Livingstone, Neil (1998). Yun, Lee Too (ed.). Pedagogy and Power: Rhetorics of Classical Learning. CUP. ISBN 978-0521594356.
- Lynch, Michael (1992). Scotland: A New History (2011 ed.). Pimlico. ISBN 0712698930.
- Mackie, JD; Lenman, Bruce; Parker, Geoffrey (1986). A History of Scotland. Hippocrene Books. ISBN 978-0880290401.
- MacInnes, Alan (ed), Graham, Lesley (ed), German, Kieran (ed), Higgins, Ian (2014). Jonathan Swift's Memoirs of a Jacobite in Living with Jacobitism, 1690–1788: The Three Kingdoms and Beyond. Routledge. ISBN 978-1848934702.
- McDonald, Alan (1998). The Jacobean Kirk, 1567–1625: Sovereignty, Polity and Liturgy. Routledge. ISBN 185928373X.
- Meza, Pedro Thomas (1973). "The Question of Authority in the Church of England, 1689 to 1717". Historical Magazine of the Protestant Episcopal Church. 42 (1): 63–86. JSTOR 42973369.
- Miller, John (1978). James II; A study in kingship. Menthuen. ISBN 978-0413652904.
- Mills, Frederick V (2004). "White, William". Oxford Dictionary of National Biography (online ed.). Oxford University Press. doi:10.1093/ref:odnb/74335. (Subscription, Wikipedia Library access or UK public library membership required.)
- Mitchell, Albert (1937). "The Non-Jurors; 1688-1805". The Churchman. 51 (2).
- Monod, Paul Kleber (1993). Jacobitism and the English People, 1688–1788. Cambridge University Press. ISBN 978-0521447935.
- Moody; Martin; Byrne (2009). A New History of Ireland: Volume III: Early Modern Ireland 1534-1691. OUP. ISBN 9780198202424.
- Ollard, SL (1912). A Dictionary of English Church History. Mowbray & Co.
- Overton, JH (1902). The Nonjurors: Their Lives, Principles And Writings (2007 ed.). Kessinger Publishing. ISBN 978-0548723623.
- Parrish, David (2013). Jacobitism and the British Atlantic world in the age of Anne (PHD). Glasgow University.
- Pittock, Murray (1998). Jacobitism. Palgrave Macmillan. ISBN 978-0333667989.
- Robb, Steven (2013). "Gordon, Robert (1703-1779)". Oxford Dictionary of National Biography (online ed.). Oxford University Press. doi:10.1093/ref:odnb/105934. (Subscription, Wikipedia Library access or UK public library membership required.)
- Robb, Steven (2021). "Bishop Cartwright of Shrewsbury and the Orthodox British Church". Transactions of the Shropshire Archaeological and Historical Society. 96.
- Schlenther, Boyd Stanley (2008). "Hastings [née Shirley], Selina, countess of Huntingdon (1707–1791)". Oxford Dictionary of National Biography (online ed.). Oxford University Press. doi:10.1093/ref:odnb/12582. (Subscription, Wikipedia Library access or UK public library membership required.)
- Scott, Beatrice (1983). "Lady Elizabeth Hastings". The Yorkshire Archaeological Journal. 55.
- Shukman, Ann (2006). Doll, Peter (ed.). The Non-Jurors, Peter the Great, and the Eastern Patriarchs in "Anglicanism and Orthodoxy: 300 Years after the Greek College in Oxford". Peter Lang. ISBN 978-3039105809.
- Simms, J.G (1970). "The Bishops' Banishment Act of 1697 (9 Will. III, C. 1)". Irish Historical Studies. 17 (66): 185–199. doi:10.1017/S0021121400111381. S2CID 191800775.
- Stephen, Jeffrey (2013). Defending the Revolution: The Church of Scotland 1689–1716. Ashgate. ISBN 978-1409401346.
- Szechi, Daniel; Sankey, Margaret (November 2001). "Elite Culture and the Decline of Scottish Jacobitism 1716-1745". Past & Present (173).
- Szechi, Daniel (2006). 1715: The Great Jacobite Rebellion. Yale University Press. ISBN 978-0300111002.
- Walker, Peter (2017). "The Bishop Controversy, the Imperial Crisis, and Religious Radicalism in New England, 1763-74". New England Quarterly. XC (3).
- Walsh, John (1993). Hayton, Colin (ed.). Introduction in The Church of England C.1689-c.1833: From Toleration to Tractarianism. Cambridge University Press. ISBN 978-0521417327.
- Wedgwood, CV (1955). The King's Peace, 1637-1641 (1983 ed.). Penguin Classics. ISBN 978-0140069907.
- Wormsley, David (2015). James II: The Last Catholic King. Allen Lane. ISBN 978-0141977065.
- Yates, Nigel (2017). Eighteenth-century Britain: Religion and Politics, 1715-1815. Routledge. ISBN 978-1138154346.
