= George Hickes (divine) =

English priest and scholar (1642–1715)

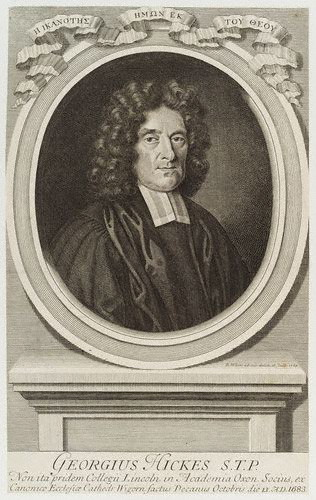
George Hickes

George Hickes (20 June 1642 O.S. – 15 December 1715 O.S.) was an English divine and scholar.

== Biography ==
Hickes was born at Newsham, near Thirsk, Yorkshire, in 1642. After going to school at Thirsk he went to Northallerton Grammar School in 1652 where he was a classmate of Thomas Rymer. In 1659 he entered St John's College, Oxford, whence after the Restoration he removed to Magdalen College and then to Magdalen Hall. In 1664 he was elected fellow of Lincoln College, and in the following year proceeded M.A. In 1673 he graduated in divinity, and in 1675 he was appointed rector of St Ebbes, Oxford. In 1676, as private chaplain, he accompanied the Duke of Lauderdale, the royal commissioner, to Scotland, and shortly afterwards received the degree of D.D. from St Andrews.

In 1680 he became vicar of All Hallows, Barking, London; and after having been made chaplain to the king in 1681, he was in 1683 promoted to the deanery of Worcester. He opposed both James II's declaration of indulgence and Monmouth's rising, and he tried in vain to save from death his nonconformist brother John Hickes (1633-1683), one of the Sedgemoor refugees harboured by Alice Lisle. At the revolution of 1688, having declined to take the oath of allegiance Hickes was first suspended and afterwards deprived of his deanery. When he heard of the appointment of a successor he affixed to the cathedral doors a protestation and claim of right.

After remaining some time in concealment in London, he was sent by Sancroft and the other nonjurors to James II in France on matters connected with the continuance of their episcopal succession; upon his return in 1694 he was himself consecrated suffragan bishop of Thetford in the non-juring church. His later years were largely occupied in controversies and in writing, while in 1713 he persuaded two Scottish bishops, James Gadderar and Archibald Campbell, to assist him in consecrating Jeremy Collier, Samuel Hawes and Nathaniel Spinckes as bishops among the non-jurors.

== Writings ==
Today Hickes is remembered chiefly for his pioneering work in linguistics and Anglo-Saxon languages. His chief writings in this vein are the Institutiones Grammaticae Anglo-Saxonicae et Moeso-Gothicae (1689), and the celebrated Linguarum veterum septentrionalium thesaurus grammatico-criticus et archæologicus (1703–1705).

His earliest writings, which were anonymous, were suggested by contemporary events in Scotland: the execution of James Mitchell on a charge of having attempted to murder Archbishop James Sharp, and that of John Kid and John King, Presbyterian ministers, for high treason and rebellion (Ravillac Redivivus, 1678; The Spirit of Popery speaking out of the Mouths of Phanatical Protestants, 1680). In his Jovian (an answer to Samuel Johnson's Julian the Apostate, 1682), he endeavoured to show that the Roman empire was not hereditary, and that the Christians under Julian had recognized the duty of passive obedience.

Hickes also made contributions to Anglican theology. His two treatises, one Of the Christian Priesthood and the other Of the Dignity of the Episcopal Order, originally published in 1707, have been more than once reprinted, and form three volumes of the Library of Anglo-Catholic Theology (1847). Bishop Hoadly attacked the high-church views of Hickes in his "Preservative Against the Principles of the Nonjurors" and in his famous 1717 sermon "The Nature of the Kingdom of Christ". Hickes can therefore be said to have offered the provocation that set off the Bangorian Controversy.

In 1705 and 1710 were published Collections of Controversial Letters, in 1711 a collection of Sermons, and in 1726 a volume of Posthumous Discourses. Other treatises, such as the Apologetical Vindication of the Church of England, are to be met with in Edmund Gibson's Preservative against Popery. There is a manuscript in the Bodleian Library which sketches his life to the year 1689, and many of his letters are extant in various collections. A posthumous publication of his, The Constitution of the Catholick Church and the Nature and Consequences of Schism (1716), gave rise to the Bangorian Controversy.

== Sources ==
- Macray, William Dunn (1891). "Hickes, George" . In Stephen, Leslie; Lee, Sidney (eds.). Dictionary of National Biography. Vol. 26. London: Smith, Elder & Co.
- John Henry Overton, The Nonjurors (1902).
- Harris, Richard L. A Chorus of Grammars: The Correspondence of George Hickes and His Collaborators on the "Thesaurus Linguarum Septentrionalium". Toronto: Pontifical Inst. of Mediaeval Studies, 1992.
- George Hickes, "Linguarum Veterum Septentrionalium Thesaurus Grammatico-Criticus et Archaeologicus", Oxoniae, 1705. Full Text at Internet Archive
