= Abel Roper =

Abel Roper (1665–1726) was an English journalist, who wrote in the Tory interest.

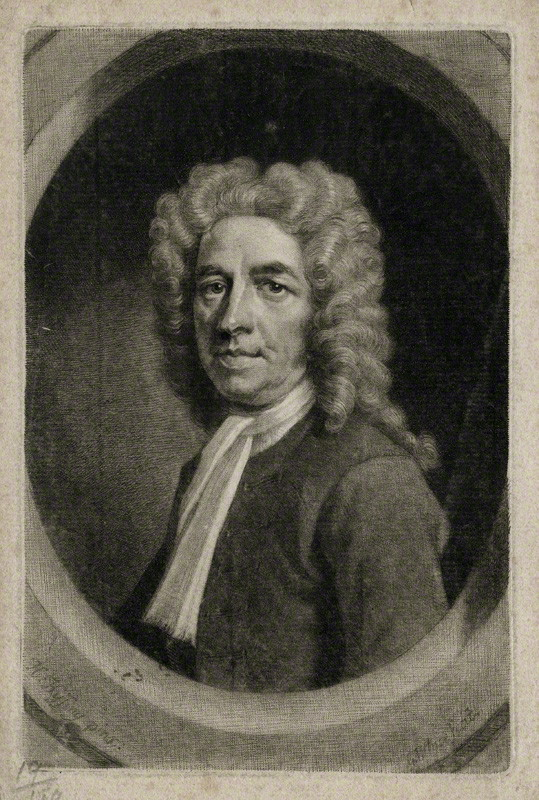
Abel Roper, engraving by George White after Hans Hysing.

== Life ==
A younger son of Isaac Roper, he was born at Atherstone in Warwickshire, and baptised on 13 September 1665. He was adopted in 1677 by his uncle, Abel Roper, who published books from 1638 at the Spread Eagle, opposite St. Dunstan's Church, Fleet Street, and was master of the Stationers' Company in that year. When he was fourteen, young Roper was apprenticed to his uncle, but on the latter's death, in 1680, he was turned over to the printer Christopher Wilkinson. Under his uncle's will he received £100. on the completion of his apprenticeship, with all the elder Roper's copyrights; and having married, when he was 30, the widow of his last master, he set up business in one side of a saddler's shop near Bell Yard, opposite Middle Temple Gate. Later he moved next door to the Devil Tavern, at the sign of the Black Dog.

Roper is said to have worked for the Glorious Revolution, and to have been the first printer of Lilliburlero. The preface to The Life of William Fuller, the pretended evidence, 1692, is signed by Roper. A warrant was issued for his arrest in May 1696, on an information that, under the name of John Chaplin, he had printed a paper, on the Jacobite assassination plot of George Barclay and others, called An Account of a most horrid Conspiracy against the Life of his most sacred Majesty, with intent to give notice to the people mentioned in it to fly from justice. He had been committed to prison on 18 April, but was released soon afterwards.

Roper sided with Tom Brown in his quarrel with Richard Kingston, and after 1700 he undertook the publication of Brown's works. Brown subsequently assisted Roper in The Auction of Ladies, a series of lampoons which ran to eight or nine numbers. Roper got into trouble: for his Newsletters into the Country, and with Secretary William Trumbull for printing a play without license. He was summoned before the lord mayor and court of aldermen for reflecting upon the Society for the Reformation of Manners. A Frenchman named Fontive, who wrote the Postman, was Roper's assistant, and afterwards his partner.

In May 1695 Roper had started a newspaper called the Post Boy, which appeared three times a week, and was the rival of the Whig Flying Post, begun by George Ridpath in the same month. Roper's enemies said he wrote for either party, according as he was paid. John Dunton said that the Post Boy was written by a man named Thomas, and on his death by Abel Boyer, compiler of the Annals of Queen Anne, which Roper published. After editing the Post Boy for Roper for four years, Boyer started a True Post Boy of his own.

When Richard Steele lost the post of gazetteer in October 1710, Roper, on whose behalf Lord Denbigh had written to Lord Dartmouth in June, was an unsuccessful candidate for the vacant post. Next year (November 1711) Roper gave offence by papers printed in the Post Boy on behalf of the proposed peace in the War of Spanish Succession, and, upon complaint of diplomats from the king of Portugal and the Duke of Savoy, he was arrested on a warrant from Lord Dartmouth, and bound over to appear at the court of queen's bench. He escaped further punishment by begging pardon and publishing a recantation. It was suspected that others behind the scenes made use of Roper's paper for party purposes. Jonathan Swift sometimes sent malicious paragraphs to the Post Boy. The pamphlet Cursory but Curious Observations of Mr. Abel R—er, upon a late famous Pamphlet entitled “Remarks on the Preliminary Articles offered by the F. K. in hopes to procure a general Peace,” 1711, was a satire against Roper; the Tory Annals, faithfully extracted out of Abel Roper's famous writings, vulgarly called “Post Boy and Supplement,” appeared in 1712.

Roper had his wig pulled off and was beaten by Lord William Powlett in April 1712, for some old offence. The Ipswich MP William Thompson threatened to cut his throat to get a retraction from Roper of remarks about his property ownership and qualification, which was not forthcoming.

The Character of Richard St[ee]le, Esq., with some remarks by Toby, Abel's kinsman, appeared on 12 Nov. 1713, and was often mentioned in the Post Boy. This libel was either by Dr. William Wagstaffe, in whose Miscellaneous Works it appeared in 1726, or by Swift; anyway not by Roper. The writer of a hostile pamphlet called Some Memoirs of the Life of Abel, Toby's Uncle, by Dr. Andrew Tripe, which appeared on 11 December 1725, says that "TobyW was Roper's nephew, Edward King, son of Thomas King, a farrier of Coventry, and Ruth Roper, Abel's sister; King helped in his uncle's business.

Soon after Queen Anne's death the Post Boy gave offence to the Whig government, and Roper was examined on 27 August 1714. He said he had for some time not been concerned in the paper; and John Morphew, the publisher of it, said he did not know the author of the offending articles, but that it was long since he had accounted to Roper for the profits. Subsequently, Roper sank into obscurity, and he died on 5 February 1726.
