= Charles Leslie (nonjuror) =

Anglican nonjuring divine

The Reverend Charles Leslie
- Church: Church of Ireland

Orders
- Ordination: 1681

Personal details
- Born: 27 July 1650 Dublin, Ireland
- Died: April 13, 1722 (aged 71–72) Glaslough, County Monaghan, Ireland,
- Buried: Glaslough
- Education: Trinity College, Dublin

Charles Leslie (27 July 1650 – 13 April 1722) was a former Church of Ireland priest who became a leading Jacobite propagandist after the 1688 Glorious Revolution. One of a small number of Irish Protestants to actively support the Stuarts after 1688, he is best remembered today for his role in publicising the 1692 Massacre of Glencoe.

== Life ==
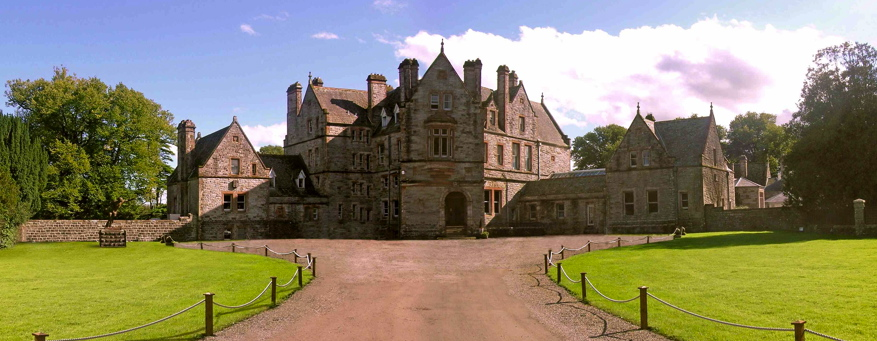
Castle Leslie, the family estate in Glaslough

One of eight surviving children, Charles Leslie was the sixth son of John Leslie (1571–1671) and Katherine, daughter of Dr. Alexander Cunningham, Dean of Raphoe. Originally from Stuartfield in Scotland, from 1628 to 1633 John Leslie served as bishop of the Isles, a diocese in the Church of Scotland and a member of the Privy Council of Scotland. In 1633, he moved to Ireland and appointed Church of Ireland bishop of Raphoe, then bishop Clogher from 1661 until his death in 1671.

Born on 27 July 1650 in Dublin, Charles was allegedly named after the executed Charles I and educated at Enniskillen school and Trinity College, Dublin. After his father died at the age of 100 in 1671, he studied law in London before changing career and being ordained as an Anglican priest in 1681. Shortly afterwards, he returned to the family estate at Glaslough in County Monaghan and married Jane Griffith; they had a daughter, Jane, who married Reverend James Hamilton, and two sons, Robert (1683–1744) and Henry who were also Jacobites and spent time in exile. They both eventually returned to Ireland and were friendly with Jonathan Swift, who had known their father.

== Career ==
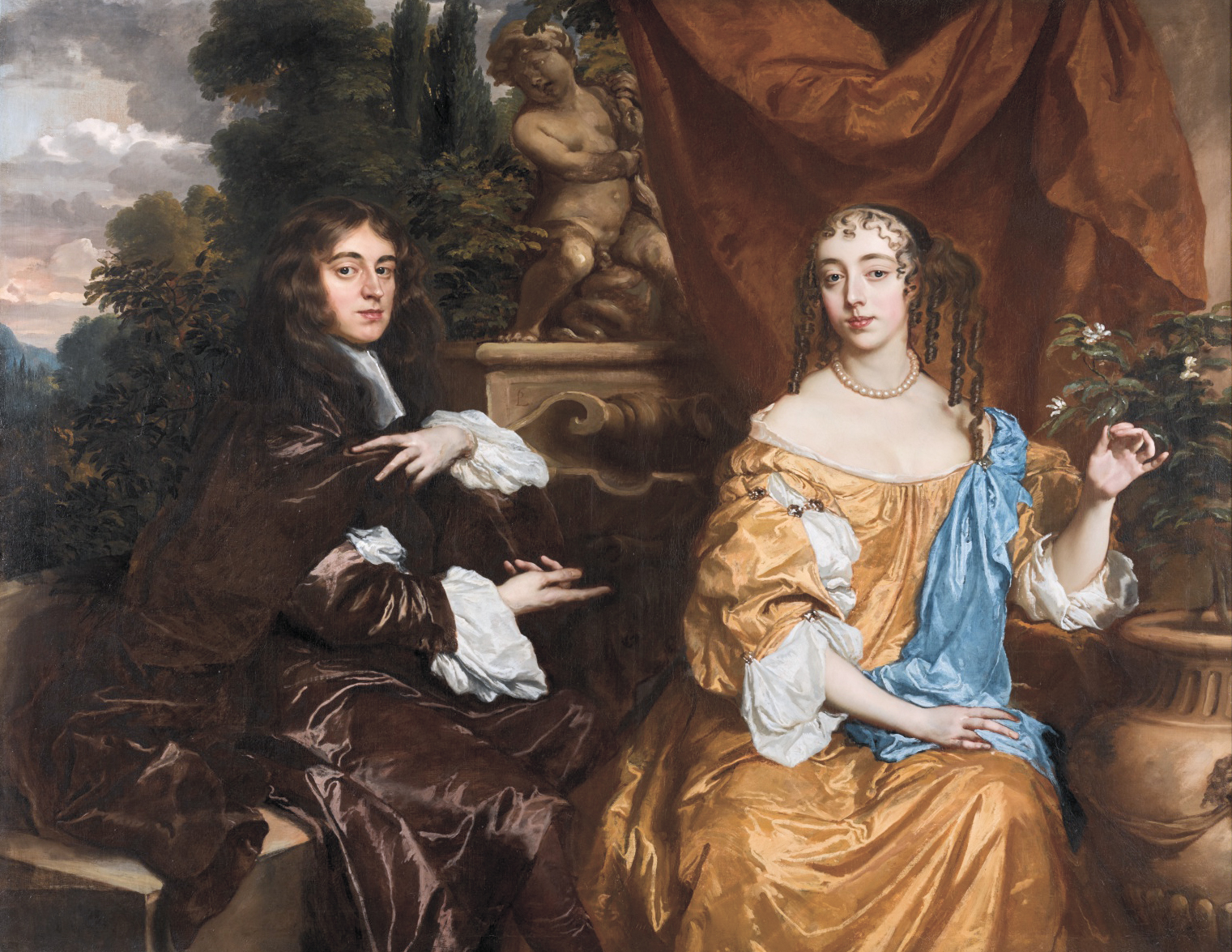
Henry Hyde, Earl of Clarendon (1638–1709); Charles Leslie's first patron

Charles was appointed assistant curate for the Church of Ireland parish of Donagh but "...as most of his parish was Roman Catholic or Presbyterian, he had few duties." John Leslie had been chaplain to Charles I and a key supporter of Caroline religious reforms, first in Scotland, then in Ireland as Bishop of Raphoe in 1633, while the estate at Glaslough was granted by Charles II in 1660 as a reward for his service. With this background, Charles was a firm supporter of the Stuart dynasty, although deeply hostile to Catholicism, and soon became involved in political and theological disputes.

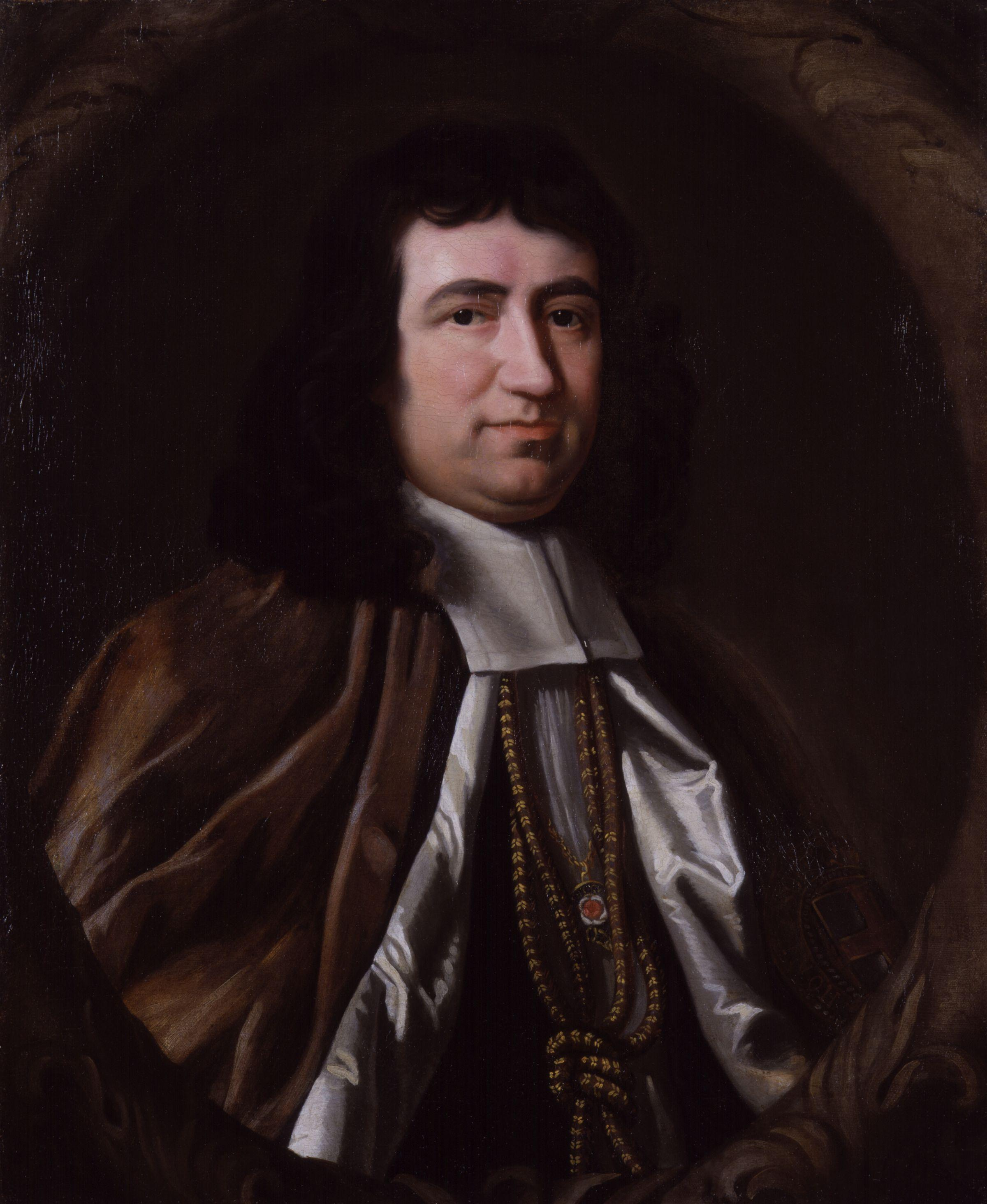
Gilbert Burnet, Bishop of Salisbury described Leslie as "the violentest Jacobite" active in England

When the Catholic James II became King in 1685, his brother-in-law Henry Hyde, Earl of Clarendon was appointed Lord-Lieutenant of Ireland; in July 1686, Leslie's legal training resulted in Clarendon making him chancellor of Connor cathedral and later Justice of the Peace. Clarendon's authority was overshadowed by his Catholic deputy Richard Talbot, 1st Earl of Tyrconnell, who began undermining legal restrictions on Catholics embodied in the Test Act. Clarendon employed Leslie's polemical skills to oppose the appointment of Catholics to public office but he was recalled in 1687; when James was deposed by the Glorious Revolution in December 1688, Leslie was in the Isle of Wight.

Shortly afterwards, he became Clarendon's personal chaplain and like his patron refused to take the oath of allegiance to William III and Mary II. Like other Non-Jurors, he was deprived of his Church offices and became instead one of the most prominent Jacobite and Tory propagandists; this included a long dispute with his Trinity College contemporary William King, who supported the Revolution. Gilbert Burnet, Bishop of Salisbury later named him "the violentest Jacobite" active in England during these years. He spent the next twenty years writing various controversial pamphlets in favour of the nonjuring cause, and numerous polemics against Quakers, Jews, Socinians, and Deists as well as Catholics.

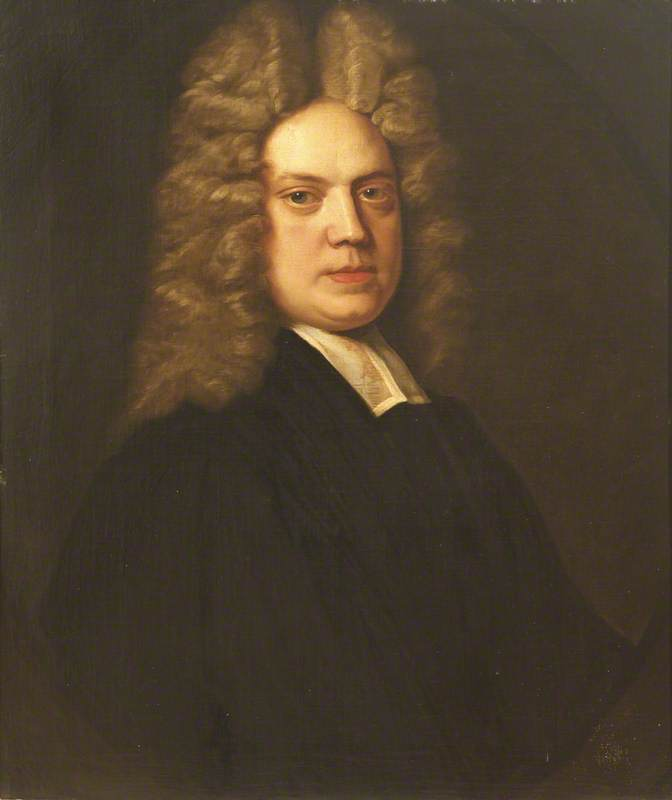
Henry Sacheverell; originally a close ally, Leslie's quarrel with him and other Tories eventually led to his exile in 1711

Much of his early writing focused on Scotland, where the 1690 Settlement ended Episcopacy and restored a Presbyterian kirk; Leslie used this to inspire concern about William's intentions towards the Church of England. Ironically, his modern fame now rests primarily on a pamphlet written in 1695, called Gallienus Redivivus, or Murther will out, &c. Being a true Account of the De Witting of Glencoe, Gaffney, &c. The focus of this was William's alleged complicity in the 1672 death of Dutch Republican leader Johan de Witt, with other crimes including Glencoe included as secondary charges. During the 1745 Rising, Charles Stuart ordered Leslie's pamphlet and the 1695 Parliamentary minutes of the investigation to be reprinted in the Edinburgh Caledonian Mercury.

During the 1690s, he served as a messenger between James' court in exile at Saint-Germain-en-Laye and the Non-Juror community in England, including the Non-Juror bishops Jeremy Collier, Thomas Ken and George Hickes. Leslie defended Collier and two other Non-Juror priests when they became involved in a furore over the execution of Sir John Friend and Sir William Parkyns, for their role in the 1696 Jacobite plot to assassinate William. Immediately prior to the execution, the clergymen declared the two absolved of their sins, effectively declaring the correctness of their actions, whilst also performing a rite not recognised by the Church of England.

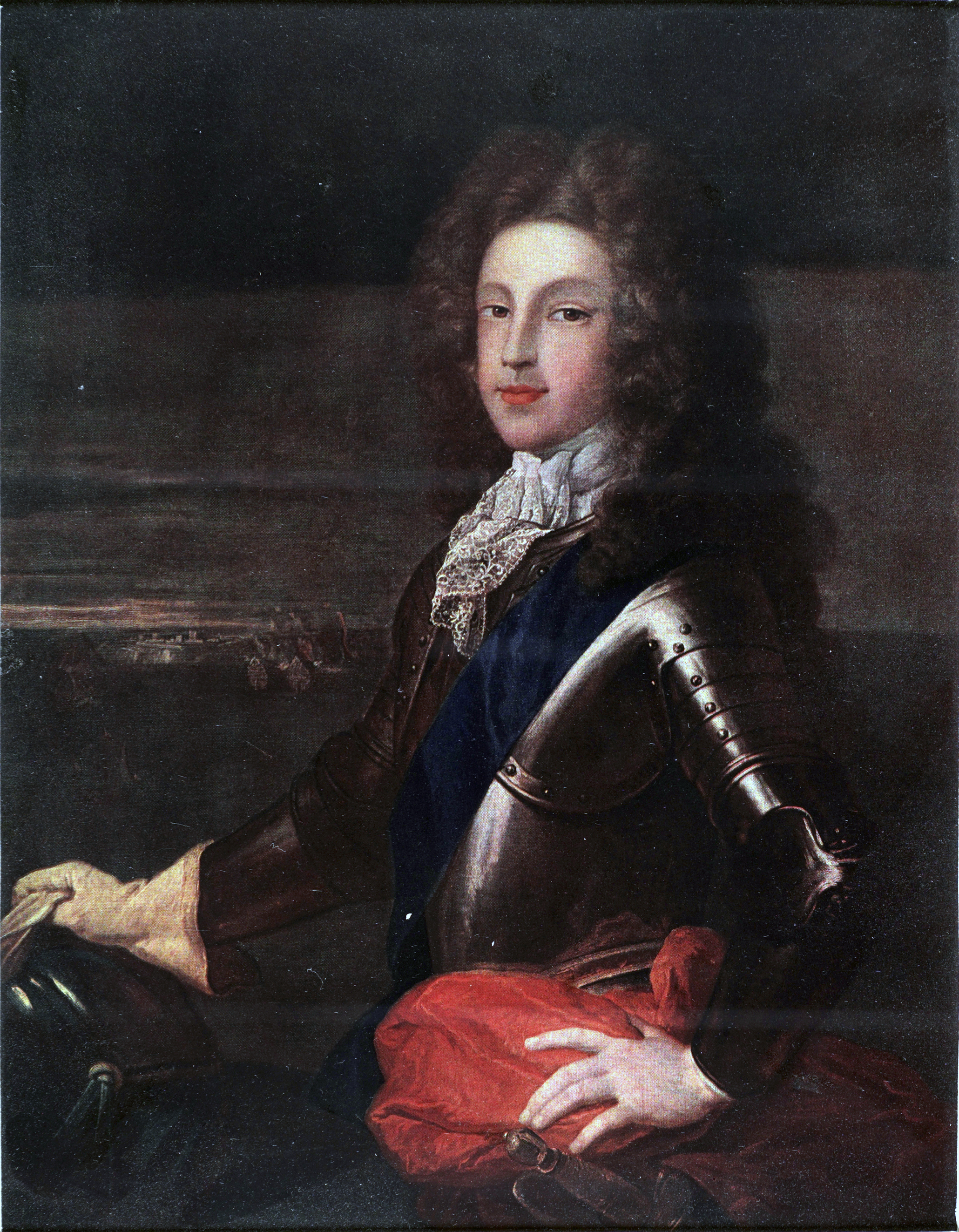
James Francis Edward; Leslie remained a committed Jacobite but struggled with James' devout Catholicism

In 1702, the accession of Queen Anne, the last Stuart monarch, caused a resurgence in Jacobite activity and in 1704, Leslie began a weekly periodical initially called The Observator, later The Rehearsal of Observator and finally The Rehearsal. Although his Tory readership shared his High Church principles, Leslie was primarily a Jacobite and violently opposed the common practice of "occasional conformity." The Rehearsal was forced to close in 1709 and he fell out with his former allies, including Henry Sacheverell whose trial helped the Tories win a landslide victory in the 1710 General election.

Despite his Tory allies now being in government, a warrant was issued for Leslie's arrest for his tract The Good Old Cause, or, Lying in Truth; in 1711 he escaped to Paris, where James Francis Edward had succeeded his father as the Stuart heir in 1701. He continued to write polemics and act as a Jacobite agent; however, after the failed 1715 Rebellion, France withdrew support for the Stuarts who were forced to leave France, eventually being invited to settle in Rome by Pope Benedict XIV. The Spanish-sponsored 1719 Rising in Scotland was judged to have done more damage to the Jacobite cause than otherwise, one of its leaders concluding "it bid fair to ruin the King's Interest and faithful subjects in these parts".

Despite these failures, Leslie remained a dedicated Jacobite but his lifelong antipathy towards Catholicism made living in Rome as a Papal pensionary difficult, while hopes of converting James to Anglicanism faded due to his devout personal Catholicism. He returned to Paris in 1717 and in 1719 published a two folio-volume edition of his Theological Works; it was later claimed these placed him "very high in the list of controversial authors, the ingenuity of the arguments being equalled only by the keenest and pertinacity with which they are pursued." He invited friends and supporters to subscribe to these and by 1721, over 500 members of the House of Lords and House of Commons had pledged a total of £750. The Earl of Sunderland finally allowed him to return home, with the stipulation he cease his political activities.

Charles Leslie died at Glaslough on 13 April 1722; his grandchildren included Charles Leslie MP, whose son, in turn, was John Leslie, Bishop of Kilmore, Elphin and Ardagh.

== Works ==
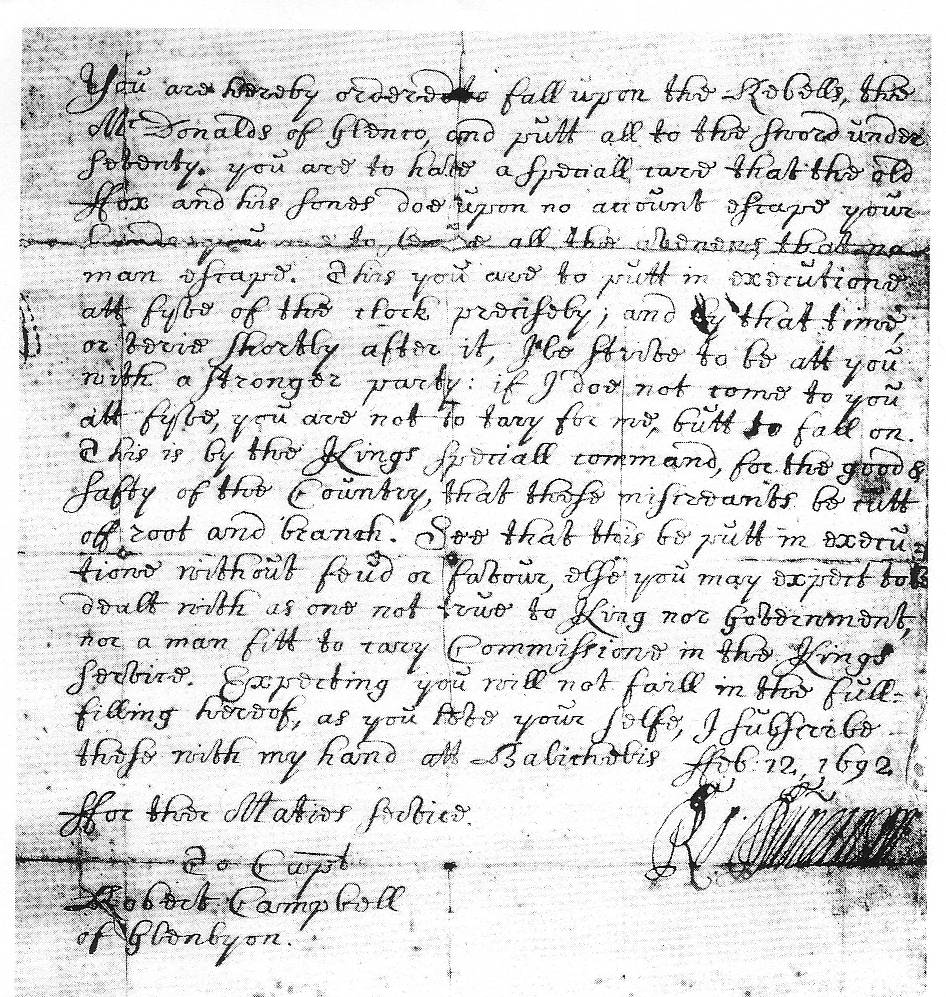
Orders for the 1692 Glencoe Massacre; used in Leslie's 1695 pamphlet "Gallienus Redivivus, or Murther will out"

In addition to his "Theological Works," Leslie produced over 81 publications, "...not counting 397 issues of his periodical, The Rehearsal (1704–1709) and represented one of the most significant ideological challenges to the post-Revolution establishment." He wrote on a wide spectrum of topics, including a detailed criticism of John Milton's Paradise Lost.

Some of his ideas were employed by 18th-century conservative writers like John Hutchinson; the rise of the Oxford Movement in the early 19th century led to the reprint of his Theological Works in the 1830s, Henry Newman one of those to reference them. Critics including Samuel Johnson and Thomas Macaulay viewed his style as more memorable than the ideas, while for modern commentators, he was defending a political ideology that bore little relationship to reality.

Leslie's polemical writing on Scotland had a greater impact and endured far longer than often appreciated. After 1745, the Glencoe Massacre faded from public view until 1859, when it re-appeared in Macaulay's History; his aim was to exonerate William of every charge made by Leslie, including the Massacre and he is the origin of the claim it was part of a Campbell-MacDonald feud. Instead, Macaulay made the Massacre more widely known while it is also argued Leslie's perspectives continue to shape views of William's reign as particularly disastrous for Scotland, with Glencoe one of a series of incidents like the Darien scheme, the famine of the late 1690s and the 1707 Union.

== Selected bibliography ==
- The Snake in the Grass (1696), against the Quakers
- A Short Method with the Jews (1689)
- Gallienus Redivivus, or, Murther Will Out (an attack on William III, 1695)
- The Socinian Controversy Discussed (1697)
- A Short And Easy Method With The Deists (1697)
- A discourse; shewing, who they are that are now qualify'd to administer baptism and the Lord's-Supper (1698)
- The True Notion of the Catholic Church (1703)
- The Case Stated between the Church of Rome and the Church of England (1713)

== Sources ==
- Chisholm, Hugh, ed. (1911). "Leslie, Charles" . Encyclopædia Britannica. Vol. 16 (11th ed.). Cambridge University Press. p. 491.
- Flaningam, John; The Occasional Conformity Controversy: Ideology and Party Politics, 1697–1711; (Journal of British Studies, 1977);
- Frank, William; Charles Leslie & Theological Politics in Post Revolutionary England; (PHD Thesis, McMaster University, 1983);
- Hopkins, Paul; Glencoe and the end of the Highland Wars; (John Donald Publishers, 1998);
- MacInnes, Alan (ed), Graham, Lesley (ed), German, Kieran (ed), Higgins, Ian (author); Jonathan Swift's Memoirs of a Jacobite in Living with Jacobitism, 1690–1788: The Three Kingdoms and Beyond; (Routledge, 2014);
- Richardson, Joseph; Archbishop William King (1650–1729): Church Tory and State Whig? (Eighteenth-Century Ireland / Iris an dá chultúr, 2000);
- Sirota, Brent; The Christian Monitors: The Church of England and the Age of Benevolence, 1680–1730; (Yale University Press, 2014);
- Szechi, Daniel; The Jacobites: Britain and Europe, 1688–1788; (Manchester University Press, 1994);
