= George Porter (conspirator) =

Jacobite conspirator 1659-1728

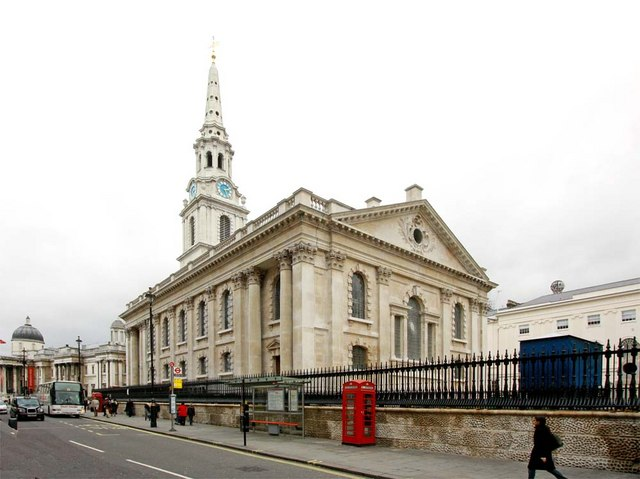
- St Martin-in-the-Fields, where Porter was married in 1712, and buried in 1728

Personal details
- Born: c. 1659 London
- Died: July 4, 1728 (aged 69) London
- Resting place: St Martin-in-the-Fields
- Spouse: Elizabeth Jones (1712-his death)
- Children: Anne Fenn

George Porter (c.1659 – 4 July 1728) was a rake from London, who took part in the 1696 Jacobite assassination plot. He escaped punishment by informing on his fellow conspirators, nine of whom were executed.

== Personal details ==
Porter was born c. 1659 in London, only child of the dramatist Thomas Porter (1636-1680), and his wife Anne (1637-1659), daughter of the Earl of Newport. His father allegedly bequeathed Porter both "his Catholicism, and propensity to violence."

== Career ==
On 10 December 1684, a true bill of manslaughter was brought against him for causing the death of Sir James Halkett during a fracas at a theatre; but he escaped punishment. In 1688, he was a captain in Colonel Henry Slingsby's regiment of horse. In May 1692, he was mentioned in a proclamation as a dangerous Jacobite, but he soon felt it safe to return to his old haunts, and in June 1695, he was temporarily taken into custody for rioting in a Drury Lane tavern and drinking King James's health.

After the death of Queen Mary, Porter associated himself more closely with Sir George Barclay, Robert Charnock, and other conspirators in the Jacobite plot. In December 1695 Charnock told him of the intention to secure the person of William III, alive or dead. Porter brought his servant Keyes into the plot; who organised the details of the plan. William was to be surprised in his coach in a miry lane between Chiswick and Turnham Green, while his guard was straggling after the passage of Queensferry. It was arranged that Porter should be one of the three leaders of the attack on the guards.

On the eve of the intended assassination, 21 February 1696, the conspirators assembled in the lodging that Porter shared with Charnock in Norfolk Street, Strand. The plot having been revealed, Porter and Keyes were pursued by the hue and cry and captured at Leatherhead. Fortunately for Porter, Sir Thomas Prendergast, 1st Baronet, the informer, who was under obligation to him, stipulated that Porter's life should be spared. Porter turned king's evidence, gaining a pardon and a grant from the exchequer (1 August 1696). His testimony facilitated the conviction of Charnock, King, Friend, Parkyns, Rookwood, Cranbourne, and Lowicke. Porter betrayed his servant Keyes, whom he had inveigled into the plot.

In November 1696 Sir John Fenwick was alarmed at the information possessed by Porter on the ramifications of this and previous plots, and he made a strenuous effort to get him out of the country. On condition that he immediately transported himself to France, he promised Porter three hundred guineas, an annuity, and a free pardon from James II. The negotiations were conducted through a barber named Clancy. Porter reported the intrigue to the authorities at Whitehall. On the day proposed for his departure to France, he met Clancy by arrangement at a tavern in Covent Garden. At a given signal Clancy was arrested, and subsequently convicted and pilloried. Later in the month Porter gave evidence against Fenwick.

Porter probably retired at the end of the year upon substantial earnings. In June 1697, he was accused of rape.

== Sources ==
- "Porter, George (fl.1695)" . Dictionary of National Biography. London: Smith, Elder & Co. 1885–1900.
