= Matthew Smith (spy) =

17th-century spy and the author of Memoirs of Secret Service

- Born: 1665
- Died: 1723?
- Education: Adams Grammar School
- Parents: Matthew Smith (d. 1672) (father); Anne Hannah Smith (1645–1723) (mother)

Matthew Smith (born c. 1665; died before 1723?) was a 17th-century spy and the author of Memoirs of Secret Service, which was published in London in 1699, and is believed to be the first spy memoir in the English language. In 1703, he was made judge advocate of Jamaica. He is believed to have died before 1723, but his exact death is not known. In 1718, his memoirs were reissued under the new title of: Private memoirs of relations to His Grace the late Duke of Shrewsbury.

== Early life ==
Smith's father, also named Matthew Smith, had been the Sheriff of Coventry in 1637, and Mayor of Coventry in 1648. Even though the elder Smith had been a Puritan, he was able to remain employed after the Restoration purges as an Alderman and Deputy lieutenant. After the year 1671, Smith became heir to the name, and became obsessed with obtaining Gentlemanly status. Smith was educated at Adams Grammar School, in Newport, Shropshire, at the same time as the Jacobite conspirator Robert Charnock and the writer Tom Brown.

On May 12, 1684, Smith was admitted into the Inner Temple under the tutelage of his uncle, Sir William Parkyns (not to be confused with his maternal grandfather, who was also named Sir William Parkyns). At the Inner Temple, Smith acted as Comptroller (student's master of the revels). After his residency ended, he would always refer to himself as "Matthew Smith, of the Inner Temple."

== Military service ==
On October 8, 1688, Smith became Captain of an Independent company raised in opposition to the invasion of William of Orange.

However, he switched sides and garrisoned Windsor Castle on the arrival of William. In March 1688, Smith became a captain in the Duke of Norfolk's new regiment. But only a few short months later, during the summer, he was purged from William's army supposedly for having Jacobite and Roman Catholic relatives.

This left him £1500 in debt, and positioned him to be in good graces with the opposition to the state.

== Intelligence service ==
In 1694, Smith was hired by the Secretary of State, Charles Talbot, 1st Duke of Shrewsbury, to spy on the Jacobites.

In December 1694, Smith reported to the Duke that his uncle, Parkyns, had concealed weapons for a cavalry unit at Marston Jabbett. The political fallout from the failed Lancashire Plot trials made it impractical to conduct a thorough search for the hidden weapons at the time.

Smith's behavior, however, was seen to be erratic, loud, boastful, and silly by the gentlemen of the court, and his claims seemed too outlandish and exaggerated, which led Shrewsbury and his under-secretary, James Vernon, to underestimate the value of his intelligence. This miscalculation proved critical when Sir George Barclay began organizing an assassination plot in the winter of 1695–96, involving Smith's uncle, Parkyns, and his former schoolmate, Charnock.

By February 1696, Smith had relayed multiple versions of their schemes to abduct the king, but inconsistencies in the details led Shrewsbury to continue to doubt their credibility. Although he informed King William, he did not emphasize the urgency of the matter, unlike the Earl of Portland, who eventually convinced the king to take Thomas Prendergast's warnings seriously.

With his health deteriorating since January, Shrewsbury left Vernon in charge of managing Smith. However, Vernon grew skeptical due to Smith's persistent demands for money, evasive behavior, and refusal to serve as a witness. While Smith was unaware of the first planned attack on the king on February 15, 1696, he provided some advance warning—though still framed as an improbable abduction attempt—before the second attempt a week later. Shrewsbury had just left for the countryside to recover, and the exposure of the plot led to speculation about his absence. Furthermore, Smith's recent letters, which had contained names and details that turned out to be accurate, became an embarrassment.

Since Smith's role as an informant remained undisclosed, Shrewsbury continued to use him as a spy but refused to let him interrogate Parkyns, who had been condemned. Smith later requested Parkyns’ forfeited estate for himself, but this was ultimately returned to the family.

Frustrated by his lack of financial reward—especially when compared to Prendergast—Smith threatened to appeal directly to King William, even boasting that he would be granted a peerage. In response, Shrewsbury dismissed him.

Seeking another patron, Smith turned to Charles Mordaunt, the Earl of Monmouth (later the third earl of Peterborough), a political rival of Shrewsbury. By May 1696, Monmouth encouraged Smith's claims that Shrewsbury had deliberately suppressed knowledge of the plot. Monmouth also had Sir William Trumbull receive Smith's documents, sealing them for protection, and supported the idea of Smith writing a detailed account of his intelligence work for the king. Around the same time, Sir John Fenwick had brought accusations against Shrewsbury of Jacobite involvement.

However, the accusations against Shrewsbury—combined with his serious illness—created unexpected political risks. Even the Whig leadership was initially unsure of King William's reaction. Meanwhile, Portland and Trumbull re-engaged Smith as a spy, but without his previous sources, his credibility declined as he began reporting unreliable rumors, which the king dismissed as mere "Jacobite news."

On November 9, King William granted Smith an audience, accepted his written account, and reassured him that Shrewsbury had conveyed his warnings. Portland, acting in good faith, promised Smith a military commission in Flanders and provided him with 50 guineas.

When the House of Lords later investigated Monmouth's interference in John Fenwick's case, they questioned Smith on January 11 and 13, 1697. However, despite Monmouth's dramatic insinuations, Smith's complaints about Shrewsbury's lack of gratitude proved underwhelming. Shrewsbury sent a letter to the Lords dismissive of any claims made by Smith, and the Lords concluded that Smith was not entitled to any further compensation.

Meanwhile, Monmouth's dubious allies in the Commons—John Arnold and the Colt brothers—began using Smith, along with William Chaloner, to pressure Shrewsbury into securing them lucrative positions, particularly at the Royal Mint. When Portland again offered Smith a military commission, he instead demanded the post of comptroller at the Mint, a position valued at £500–600 per year. His repeated threats led to his exclusion from the court. By mid-1697, Smith had begun distributing manuscript copies of his account, and in December, he unsuccessfully petitioned the Commons to clear his name.

In early 1698, Arnold provided Smith with £100 and sent him abroad to gather intelligence that could be used to challenge the government over its decision to allow certain Jacobites to return home.

== Memoirs of Secret Service, the first Spy memoir in the English language ==
Memoirs of Secret Service

In 1699, Smith finally released Memoirs of Secret Service, dedicating it to the House of Commons and sending them a copy on February 8. The book was published in a large print run, with many copies distributed for free. It contained his correspondence with Shrewsbury and Vernon, largely accurate, but framed within falsified meeting records and misleading commentary.

Richard Kingston later claimed that Tom Brown was the true author of this and Smith's later works, though Smith insisted Brown had contributed little beyond a draft preface. John Macky, however, suggested that Peterborough and Charles Davenant were responsible for the writing.

The book's bold language attracted public attention and was even translated, yet Parliament showed little interest. When Smith petitioned MPs in April, it was met with indifference.

In November 1699, he escalated his accusations against Shrewsbury in Remarks upon the D— of S—'s Letter to the House of Lords and sent the Lords a copy. By including Shrewsbury's 1697 letter, he violated parliamentary privilege, leading to his brief imprisonment in the Gatehouse in December 1699 and the public burning of his pamphlet. The earl of Peterborough attempted to defend Smith, but under examination, his claims were discredited.

In January 1700, Richard Kingston, who had been a former government spy, published a scathing pamphlet, A Modest Answer to Captain Smith's Immodest Memoirs, acting independently and against the wishes of ministers. Smith responded with A Reply to an Unjust and Scandalous Libel, a more effective rebuttal.

Following King William's death, Smith wrote a furious Case and Petition to the House of Commons, effectively accusing Shrewsbury and Vernon—now politically vulnerable—of treason, while also alleging that the late king had bribed MPs. Realizing it was poorly timed, given the recent exposure of William Fuller's false claims, Smith hesitated but ultimately submitted his allegations to Speaker Robert Harley on March 28, 1702. Harley ignored them, and with Shrewsbury abroad and Vernon removed from office, the matter was quickly forgotten.

== Judge advocate of Jamaica and later life ==
Smith's fortunes changed suddenly in August 1703 when he was appointed judge-advocate of Jamaica by both sea and land, likely due to the influence of the earl of Peterborough, who had a nominal governorship of the island.

It is unclear whether Smith ever carried out his duties personally or through deputies. Little else is recorded about his later years, and he is believed to have died before 1723, as his mother's will made no mention of him.

A Matthew Smith from Coventry (c.1667–1731), who had lived in London, married multiple times, and served as a churchwarden at St. Michael's Church, was a different individual, as confirmed by his signature.
