= Rower (disambiguation) =

A rower is a person who propels a boat using oars, typically as a sport.

Rower may also refer to:

- The Rower, a village in County Kilkenny, Ireland
- Rower–Inistioge GAA, a Gaelic sports club in County Kilkenny, Ireland
