= Robert Blackbourn =

English prisoner

Robert Blackbourn or Blackburne (died 1748) was an English Jacobite conspirator arrested for his involvement in an assassination plot of 1696.

Suspected of plotting to kill William III, he was held in Newgate Prison without trial for fifty years, eventually dying in 1748.

== Life ==
Blackbourn was the eldest son of Richard Blackbourn, gent, of Thistleton, Lancashire: his mother was Perpetua Westby of Myerscough. The Blackbourns of Thistleton were a branch of an old Roman Catholic gentry family who were influential in Lancashire. Very little is known of his early life or education.

In 1696 Blackbourn, along with Major John Bernardi and several others, was arrested in the aftermath of the discovery of a Jacobite plot against William III. In the course of another trial, a witness stated that Blackbourn had been part of James's troop of Guards and had come to the Jacobite court at Château de Saint-Germain-en-Laye in 1695. Blackbourn was claimed to have been one of the group of men, led by Ambrose Rookwood, who were to personally attack the King. Unlike the other accused, Blackbourn was initially discharged in October, having been arrested in April, but was arrested again at the Nore in December for attempting to leave the country without a pass, and was eventually returned to Newgate despite protesting his innocence and (he claimed) having no further evidence found against him since his discharge.

Despite the execution of the main plotters, Blackbourn, Bernardi and four others were never brought to trial, but were detained in Newgate prison indefinitely. Acts extending their imprisonment were passed at the start of each succeeding monarch's reign, although one man, Captain James Counter, was released by Queen Anne. The Lancashire diarist Nicholas Blundell wrote that "I made a visit to Mr. Scarisbrick in Newgate, I drank there with Mr. Blackbourn who has been a prisoner there as I take it above 21 years". The History of the Press-yard, a 1717 pamphlet claiming to have been written by a Jacobite held in Newgate, briefly describes the five imprisoned plotters including a likely reference to Blackbourn as "a Man of Pleasure [...] who had never been known to have entertain'd a melancholy Thought since his entrance into the Gaol". Later in the pamphlet "Mr Bl[ackbour]n" is asked to draw a plan of a bridge leading over the River Ribble on news of the Jacobite advance on Preston.

Bernardi and Blackbourn were the final two survivors; Bernardi, who died in Newgate in 1736 aged over eighty, is usually stated to be the final surviving prisoner. However, Bernardi's contemporary death notice stated that Blackbourn was still in Newgate at this time. The Irish mercenary soldier Captain Peter Drake, who had spent time in Newgate and often visited the surviving plotters in the Pressyard there, states in his memoirs that "Blackburn I last saw in April, 1745, he was then in the Press-yard, and well and as hearty as ever." It appears that Blackbourn did not die until as late as 1748, by which time he had been imprisoned for over fifty years without trial.
