= William Snatt =

English nonjuring clergyman

William Snatt (1645 – 1721) was an English nonjuring clergyman, who came to prominence after a failed Jacobite plot.

== Life ==
Born at Lewes, he was the son of Edward Snatt, minister and usher of the Southover free school there; in 1629 John Evelyn the diarist was a pupil. William Snatt matriculated from Magdalen College, Oxford, on 14 December 1660, and graduated B.A. in 1664. He was collated to the rectory of Denton, East Sussex, in 1672, obtained a prebend in Chichester Cathedral in 1675, and the rectory of Cliffe St. Thomas, Sussex, in the same year. He subsequently became vicar of Seaford in 1679, and of Cuckfield and Bishopstone in 1681.

A devout and consistent high churchman, Snatt resigned all his preferments rather than take the oaths to William III and Mary II. He went to London, where he found friends in Hilkiah Bedford and Jeremy Collier. Like other nonjurors, he incurred the suspicion of popery. This hostile feeling was confirmed in April 1696, when, in company with Collier and Shadrach Cook, Snatt attended Sir William Parkyns and Sir John Friend on the scaffold. These men had been found guilty of high treason in conspiring to assassinate William III. Snatt and Collier, however, joined in pronouncing absolution, performing the ceremony with the imposition of hands.

The nonjurors subsequently printed the confession of the criminals, in which the title "Church of England" was appropriated to themselves. This provoked a remonstrance from the two archbishops and ten bishops, and on 7 April the grand jury of Middlesex presented Snatt, Collier, and Cook for perpetrating a great affront to the government and a scandal to the church of England. Collier absconded, and issued pamphlets in his defence; but Snatt and Cook were committed to Newgate Prison. They were tried before the King's Bench, defended by Sir Bartholomew Shower. They were found guilty of serious misdemeanour on 2 July.

Snatt and Cook were released on bail in the following August. Snatt continued to live in London, where he died in reduced circumstances on 30 November 1721.
