= Tullogher =

Tullogher Tulachar
- Village
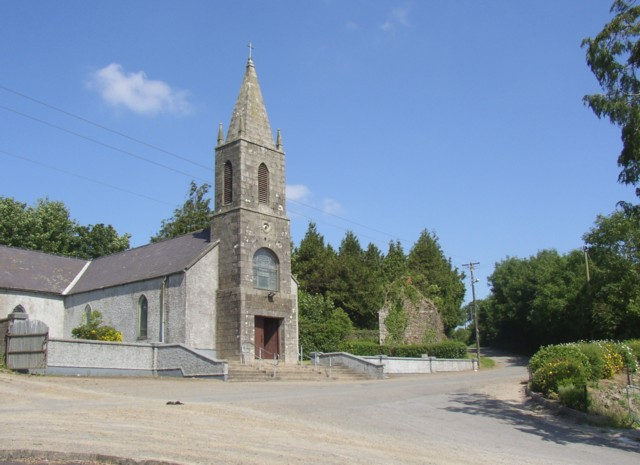
- Tullagher Church

- Location in Ireland
- Coordinates: 52°25′46.7″N 7°03′19.6″W
- Country: Ireland
- Province: Leinster
- County: Kilkenny
- Time zone: UTC+0 (WET)
  - Summer (DST): UTC-1 (IST (WEST))

Tullogher (/ɪnɪʃˈtiːɡ/; Irish: Tullachar) is a small village in County Kilkenny, Ireland. It is situated near the River Nore, approx 30 kilometres (19 mi) southeast of Kilkenny city and near the village of Listerlin 3 kilometres (1.9 mi). Historically, the name has been spelt as Tullagher, Thulachair, and in other ways.

It has a large Roman Catholic church (St. Aidan's), part of the diocese of Ossory. The church part of the wider Tullogher parish, which consists of two other churches including Assumption Church in Rosbercon and St. David's church in Listerlin, with additional graveyards at Shanbough and Ballyneale. It is bounded by the parishes of Glenmore to the south and Mullinavat to the west and The Rower - Inistioge to the north and west.

== See also ==
- List of abbeys and priories in Ireland (County Kilkenny)
- List of towns and villages in Ireland
