= George Ridpath =

Scottish journalist

George Ridpath (died 1726) was a Scottish journalist, who wrote in the Whig interest.

== Life ==
He was brought up by his mother at Cockburnspath, Berwickshire, until he went to Edinburgh University. In 1681, he was tutor, or servant, at Edinburgh to the sons of a Mr. Gray, and took an active part in the burning of the Pope in effigy by the students; the clerk to the council wrote that Ridpath was not then a boy. He was kept in irons for some days, and was charged with threatening to burn the provost's house, but after five weeks' imprisonment he was banished from Scotland. He went to London to seek a livelihood by his pen.

Soon after the Glorious Revolution he was an active London journalist. In 1696, Ridpath was acting as a sort of spy on the bishop of Glasgow and on Dr. Alexander Monro. The name George Ridpath is among those who graduated at Edinburgh in 1699.

Ridpath conducted the Whig journal the Flying Post or Postman which, according to John Dunton, sold well. It was established in 1695.

On 4 September 1712, William Hurt was arrested for printing in the paper scandalous and seditious reflections on Queen Anne and the government. On the 8th Ridpath was committed to Newgate Prison for being the author of three libels in the Observator, to which he became a contributor in succession to John Tutchin in 1712, and in the Flying Post; but he was released on bail. On 23 October Ridpath and Hurt appeared in the court of Queen's Bench, and were continued on their recognisances.

Jonathan Swift complained about bail being allowed for the "Scotch rogue" Ridpath, who continued to write when at liberty. On 19 February 1713 Ridpath was tried at the London Guildhall. The trial was to a large extent a party matter, and Ridpath's counsel were Sergeant Pratt, Sir Peter King, and Messrs. Nicholas Lechmere, St. Leger, Fortescue, and Spencer Cowper.

A collection had been made on Ridpath's behalf, and Whigs were told that unless they subscribed two guineas they would not be admitted to be members of the party. After a hearing of eight hours, the jury found Ridpath guilty of two of the libels, and sentence was postponed. On 1 May his recognisances of £600 were estreated, because he had failed to appear, in accordance with an order made on 27 April, and on the 25th a reward of £100 was offered by Henry Bolingbroke for his discovery; but without result: Ridpath had fled to Scotland, and then to Holland.

In Ridpath's absence the Flying Post was carried on by Stephen Whatley, under his general directions. In 1714 it was found that the printer, Hurt, had dealings with Daniel Defoe, Ridpath's rival journalist, and the Flying Post was taken out of his hands. Defoe came to Hurt's assistance, and on 27 July published, through Hurt, a rival newspaper, The Flying Post and Medley. Ridpath by now lived at Rotterdam, but early in 1714 feared arrest.

After the accession of George I, Ridpath returned to England, and was made one of the patentees for serving the commissioners of the customs in Scotland with stationery wares. The Flying Post still attacked the Tories, and Ridpath made slanderous charges against Nathaniel Mist and others.

In 1722 Ridpath was secretary to a lottery at Harburg-Wilhelmsburg in Hanover, with a trading company. The king denied having sanctioned the lottery, and a committee of the House of Commons examined Ridpath in December and January 1723. Most of the company's money had been lost in the South Sea Company, and a bill was introduced to suppress the lottery. In February, the trustees announced, through Ridpath, that they would return all tickets on application.

After this date Ridpath avoided old friends; it was alleged he had married two wives at the same time, and after his death Lord Grange repeated this report, adding that it was said that Ridpath had joined with the Arians and non-subscribers, and slighted those who once supported him.

Ridpath died on 5 February 1726, the same day as his old antagonist Abel Roper. He left all his estate to his wife, Esther Ridpath, daughter of George Markland. His only son had died in 1706. Ridpath's papers fell into the hands of Dr. James Fraser, one of Wodrow's correspondents.

== Works ==
In 1687, Ridpath published a new method of shorthand, Shorthand yet Shorter, with a dedication to Philip Wharton, 4th Baron Wharton, under whose roof the book had been written, while Ridpath was a servant there. The author also undertook to give lessons. A second edition of his manual appeared in 1696.

In 1693, writing under the name of Will Laick, he made an attack on the episcopal party in Scotland in An Answer to the Scotch Presbyterian Eloquence, and A Continuation of the Answer. These were attacked in Dr. Alexander Monro's Apology for the Clergy of Scotland, and The Spirit of Calumny and Slander examined, chastised, and exposed, in a letter to a malicious libeller. More particularly addressed to Mr. George Ridpath, newsmonger, near St. Martins-in-the-Fields. He replied in The Scots Episcopal Innocence, 1694, and The Queries and Protestation of the Scots episcopal clergy against the authority of the Presbyterian General Assemblies, 1694.

In 1695, Ridpath published, with a dedication to James Johnston, a translation of a Latin work De hominio disputatio adversus eos qui Scotiam feudum ligium Angliae, regemque Scotorum eo nomine hominium Anglo debere asserunt from 1605 of Sir Thomas Craig, as Scotland's Sovereignty asserted; being a dispute concerning Homage, and in 1698 he translated N. de Souligné's Political Mischiefs of Popery. In A Dialogue between Jack and Will, concerning the Lord Mayor's going to meeting-houses with the sword carried before him, 1697, he defended Sir Humphry Edwin, a presbyterian lord mayor; and this was followed in 1699 by A Rowland for an Oliver, or a sharp rebuke to a saucy Levite. In answer to a sermon preached by Edward Oliver, M.A., before Sir Humphry Edwin. By a Lover of Unity. A book called The Stage Condemned, in support of Jeremy Collier's Short View of the Immorality and Profaneness of the English Stage, appeared in September 1698, and the author of a reply, The Stage Acquitted, says it was by Mr. R[idpa]th, the formidable author of a scandalous newspaper, and the wretched retailer of mad Prynne's enthusiastic cant.

Ridpath's Scotland's Grievances relating to Darien, humbly offered to the consideration of the Parliament, 1700, contained remarks about a foreign yoke. Next year came his The Great Reasons and Interests considered anent the Spanish Monarchy, and in 1702 A Discourse upon the Union of England and Scotland. By a lover of his country, in which Ridpath opposed a union. In 1703 he printed The Case of Scotsmen residing in England and in the English Plantations, and An Historical Account of the ancient Rights and Power of the Parliament of Scotland. These were followed by An Account of the Proceedings of the Parliament of Scotland, 1703, 1704, and The reducing of Scotland by Arms … considered, 1705. According to one of the replies to this last pamphlet, its author and publisher were bound over to appear at the queen's bench bar. In 1706 Ridpath wrote Considerations upon the Union of the two Kingdoms, and was answered in Sir John Clerk's Letter to a Friend, giving an Account how the Treaty of Union has been received here. With Remarks upon what has been written by Mr. H[odges] and Mr. R[idpath], a piece which has been erroneously attributed to Defoe.

In 1704–5, Ridpath assisted James Anderson, who was then preparing his Historical Essay showing that the Crown and Kingdom of Scotland is Imperial and Independent; and in 1705, he commenced a correspondence with the Rev. Robert Wodrow, chiefly on the subject of the union and the episcopal church in Scotland. The Scots' Representations to Her Majesty, against setting up the Common Prayer-Book in Scotland, 1711, was written, according to a note in the copy in the Advocates' Library, by Ridpath, William Carstares, and Defoe. Another piece attributed to Ridpath is The Oath of Abjuration considered, Edinburgh, 1712. He was also employed in correcting Captain Woodes Rogers's Voyage; assisted in writing the periodical History of the Works of the Learned; invented the "Polygraphy", a writing-engine, moved by the foot, by which six or more copies could be written at once; contributed to the Medley in 1712; and was in constant strife with the Tory Post Boy, published by Abel Roper. John Dunton, an admirer, described his style as excellent.

In 1713, Ridpath wrote Some Thoughts concerning the Peace, and the Thanksgiving appointed by authority to be observed for it; and certain observations on the address of the Highlanders to Queen Anne, which he complained was signed only by ten, four of whom were Catholics, called forth The Honourable Chieftains of the Highland Clans vindicated from the false Aspersions and scurrilous Reflections thrown upon them by Ridpath, the scandalous and justly condemned Libeller, Edinburgh, 1713. In 1714, he published a book called Parliamentary Right maintained, or the Hanover Succession justified, in answer to Hilkiah Bedford's Hereditary Right to the Crown of England asserted. His letters to the English minister at The Hague give an account of the difficulties in getting this work circulated (Stowe MSS.). Copies were sent by various ships to different ports in England; but many were lost or thrown overboard by the captains, or were returned because no one dared receive them. He had political correspondence with persons in Scotland, and in April he wrote The New Project examined, or the Design of the Faction to deprive the Hanover Family of the power to name Lord Justices anatomised, but it is doubtful whether this pamphlet was printed.

In 1717 he was giving Wodrow advice in the preparation of the History of the Sufferings of the Church of Scotland, and was himself proposing to write a continuation of George Buchanan's Scotch History. In 1719, when he was living in Greville Street, Holborn, he published An Appeal to the Word of God for the Trinity in Unity. Alexander Pope wrote (Dunciad, i. 208):

To Dulness Ridpath is as dear as Mist.

According to Wodrow, the dedication to the Lower House of Convocation, prefixed to the collected edition of the Independent Whig, 1721, is by Ridpath. It is an attack on the unscriptural claims of the clergy, who are charged with teaching the need of giving endowments rather than plain morality and religion.

== Publications ==
- Shorthand yet Shorter (1st edn, 1687).
- Discourse upon the Union of Scotland and England … by a Lover of his Country (1702).
