= Bartholomew Shower =

English lawyer and politician

Sir Bartholomew Shower (1658–1701) was an English lawyer and politician, Recorder of London and a distinguished High Tory.

== Life ==
He was born in Northgate Street, Exeter, on 14 December 1658, the third son of William Shower, merchant, of Exeter, by his wife Dorcas, daughter of John Anthony. John Shower was his brother. Educated in his native city, Bartholomew came to London early in 1675, entered the Middle Temple on 9 September 1676, was called to the bar on 21 May 1680, and became known as a pleader.

In 1683 he achieved prominence as an adherent of the court party by publishing a pamphlet against the executed William Russell, Lord Russell and his partisans. He followed it up in the same year with The Magistracy and Government of England Vindicated. In 1684 he moved from the Temple into Chancery Lane, and next year was appointed deputy recorder under Sir John Holt. Shower was knighted by James II at Whitehall on 12 May 1687, and was made recorder of London in place of Sir J. Tate on 6 February 1688. He was made bencher of his inn on 25 May in this year, and reader three years later. He signalised himself by his speech for the crown against the seven bishops in June 1688.

He was replaced as recorder by Sir George Treby in November 1688. After the Glorious Revolution he became a rancorous opponent of the court, and a political follower of Sir Edward Seymour, 4th Baronet. With the years Shower's Jacobitism grew more robust. He wrote a bitter squib on the opportunism of William Sherlock, and he corresponded with George Hickes the nonjuror.

In his career as lawyer, he disputed in 1695 the validity of a commitment by secretary of state for high treason in the case of the King v. Thomas Kendall and Richard Roe. In 1696 he was counsel for the defence of Ambrose Rookwood and Peter Cook, both charged with high treason; of Cook and William Snatt, the nonjuring parsons who gave absolution on the scaffold to Sir William Parkyns; and in November he defended Sir John Fenwick, strongly deprecating the proceedings by bill of attainder, on the ground that if he were acquitted his client would still be liable to proceedings under the common law. In 1698 he was retained on behalf of the "Old" East India Company, and successfully screened his political leader, Seymour, from the imputation of bribery. In June 1699 he successfully defended Charles Duncombe against a charge of falsely endorsing exchequer bills, and four months later he was elected treasurer of the Middle Temple. Next month (November 1699) he was counsel for Seymour against Captain George Kirke, who had fatally wounded the baronet's heir, Popham Seymour-Conway, in a duel. In 1701 he was ready with advice as to the best means of proceeding against the leading Kentish petitioners.

He was taken ill suddenly at the Temple Church on 2 December 1701, and two days later he died of pleurisy at his house in Temple Lane. His remains were taken to Pinner Hill, where he had recently acquired a seat, and buried in the chancel of Pinner church, where there was a slab to Shower's memory. Shower states that he was married in Bread Street in 1682 by Samuel Johnson; his wife's name was Anne Bedford born about 1659 in Canterbury, Kent.

== Works ==
The Reports printed as Shower's are:

- ‘Cases in Parliament resolved and adjudged upon Petitions and Writs of Error’ (1694–8), 1698; 3rd edit. 1740.
- ‘Reports of Cases in King's Bench from 30 Car. II to 6 William III’ (1678–95), London, 1708 and 1720, 2 vols.; 2nd edit. 1794, 2 vols. London.

They were in fact printed from a foul copy which fell into the printer's hands.
