= John Parker (Irish judge) =

English-born merchant, politician and judge

John Parker (c.1500–1564) was an English-born merchant, politician and judge in Tudor Ireland. He held the offices of Constable of Dublin Castle and Master of the Rolls in Ireland; to be appointed to the latter office was a notable achievement for a man who began his career as a cloth-maker and had no legal qualifications which would fit him for judicial office. He also sat in the Irish House of Commons in the Parliament of 1560, and was a member of the Irish Privy Council. As a politician, he was noted for leading the opposition to the Earl of Sussex, the Lord Deputy of Ireland, in the early 1560s.

== Background and business career ==
He was a native of Tenterden in Kent, where he was in business as a cloth-maker in the 1530s. He may have been the John Parker who graduated from King's College, Cambridge in 1522. Later in the same decade he joined the household of the King's uncle Arthur Plantagenet, 1st Viscount Lisle, the Governor of Calais. Throughout his career, even while acting as a public servant, he pursued his own business interests, first as a ship-owner and then as a maker of hats and tapestries. For the latter trade, he obtained a royal licence to import dyed wool. He also obtained permission to take fish from the River Bann.

He seems to have been a sincere religious reformer, although like many reformers he personally did very well out of the Dissolution of the Monasteries. He received Selskar Abbey in Wexford, Rosbercon Abbey in Kilkenny (although he apparently never lived there, and let it decay into a ruin), Holmpatrick Abbey near Skerries, County Dublin and Tircroghan in Westmeath. In his last years he was attempting to purchase Kilcormac Abbey in County Offaly. Despite his apparent wealth Parker, like so many notable figures of the Tudor era, died in debt. He was generous in disposing of land at affordable prices, which increased his popularity.

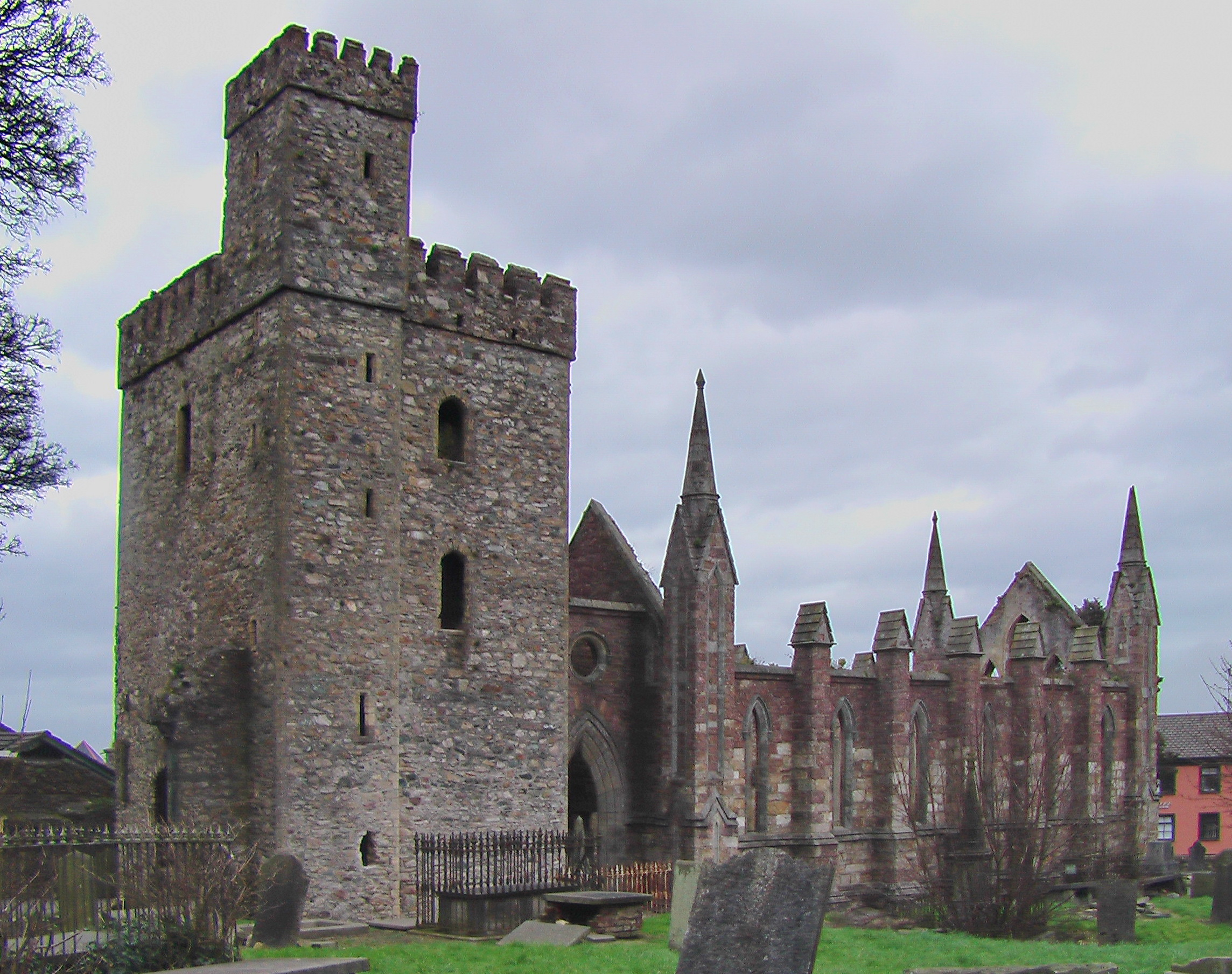
Selskar Abbey, which Parker acquired after the Dissolution of the Monasteries

== Political and judicial career ==
He is first recorded in Ireland about 1540 as secretary to the Lord Deputy, Sir Anthony St. Leger, who placed great reliance on him. After St.Leger's recall his influence declined for a time. He became Constable of Dublin Castle in 1543 and organised the defence of Carrickfergus in 1551. He entered the Irish House of Commons as MP for Trim in 1560, and was Chief Serjeant for Connacht, and a Royal Commissioner in Munster in 1562.

Although he held a number of quasi-judicial posts, such as Marshal of the Dublin Courts and usher in the Court of Exchequer (Ireland), these seem to have been sinecures. His appointment as Master of the Rolls in 1552 is more surprising; while not as important a judicial office as it later became, it nonetheless required a qualified lawyer, and Parker, as far as is known, had no legal training. He reached the height of his political influence in 1553 with his appointment to the Privy Council of Ireland. The following year he was summoned to London to answer charges of wasteful management of Government revenues, and was deprived of his seat on the council and briefly imprisoned; again his fortunes were tied to those of St. Leger, who was once more in disgrace. However, he was restored to royal favour in 1556.

== Dispute with the Earl of Sussex ==
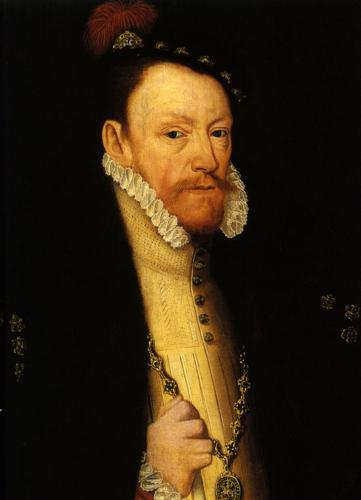
Thomas Radclyffe, Earl of Sussex: Parker became his chief enemy in Irish politics

Parker's later years were overshadowed by his bitter quarrel with the Lord Deputy, Thomas Radclyffe, 3rd Earl of Sussex. Initial relations between the two men seem to have been friendly enough: Parker entertained Sussex at Holmpatrick Abbey soon after the latter's arrival in Ireland, and they went together on an expedition against Shane O'Neill the next year. By 1562 however their mutual hostility was a major factor in Irish politics. Sussex's policies, particularly his levying of taxes, had aroused much opposition in the Pale (i.e. the four eastern counties which were under secure English rule). Parker, despite being English himself, emerged as one of the leaders of "the gentlemen of the Pale" and used his judicial authority to declare that Sussex had exceeded his legal powers. Sussex in turn accused Parker of disloyalty to the Queen and of being the author of a scurrilous book vilifying him.

Another source of contention was religion: Sussex, who had originally been appointed Lord Deputy by the devoutly Catholic Queen Mary I, was a very lukewarm Protestant: his first royal commission from Mary had included an injunction to suppress all Irish heretics and Lollards, and Parker, as an extreme Protestant reformer, had been obliged to seek a royal pardon for his recusancy. After the accession of Elizabeth I, with the Protestant reformers once more dominant, Parker, in turn, accused Sussex of a lack of religious zeal.

At the request of the gentry of the Pale, the Queen was persuaded to set up a Commission of Inquiry into the charges and counter-charges made against each other by Sussex and Parker; the Commissioners were Sir Thomas Wroth and Sir Nicholas Arnold. Initially, the inquiry went badly for Parker, who was deprived in the short term of some of his lands, and censured by the Irish Privy Council, of which he was himself a member, with the Queen's full approval. She clearly had no intention of disgracing Parker permanently, but wished him to be "reformed and taught to know his faults". Both of the Commissioners were like Parker, strong Protestants, but unlike Parker, they were not entirely unsympathetic to Sussex. The result of the inquiry was Sussex's recall to England, which he had been pressing for himself. Sussex developed a deep grievance against Arnold and later tried to impeach him, but without success. The Commissioners praised Parker for his religious zeal: whether this might have led to further career advancement is unknown, since he died the same year.

== Family ==
Parker made an advantageous marriage to the twice-widowed Marian St Lawrence, daughter of Nicholas St Lawrence, 4th Baron Howth, and mother through her first husband of Richard Nugent, 5th Baron Delvin, and of Nicholas Nugent, Chief Justice of the Irish Common Pleas. He had a son and a daughter. The noted Jacobite conspirator Colonel John Parker (c. 1651 – c. 1719) and his son General Gervais Parker (1695–1750) were descended from him.

== Character ==
Elrington Ball describes Parker as an extraordinary individual who from his modest beginning as a merchant in a small English town, despite having no legal training, rose to become a senior Irish statesman and judge, powerful enough to challenge the Earl of Sussex and able to win the respect of other leading figures in the Irish administration, such as Sussex's successor Nicholas Arnold.
