= Coolhill Castle =

- Caisleán na Cúlchoille (Irish)
- View of Coolhill Castle overlooking the Barrow. Photo from 1865–1914.

- Location within Ireland
- 52.464929°N 6.932205°W
- Type: Keep
- Location: Coolhill, The Rower, County Kilkenny, Ireland

History
- Built: 13th century

Site notes
- Area: Barrow Valley

National monument of Ireland
- Official name: Coolhill Castle
- Reference no.: 646

Coolhill Castle is a keep (donjon) and National Monument located in County Kilkenny, Ireland.

== Location ==
Coolhill Castle is located 2.1 km (1.3 mi) northeast of The Rower, on a cliff overlooking the Barrow.

== History ==
Coolhill Castle was built c. the 13th century. Henry de Rupe (de Roache, Roche) held lands at Coolhill in 1318. Art Óg mac Murchadha Caomhánach held the castle briefly during one of his campaigns. In the 1600s, about 30 de Rupe retainers were massacred at Rosbercon by English soldiers under De La Poer. The castle passed to the Mountgarret family in 1621 and was confiscated by the Roundheads in 1652.

== Building ==
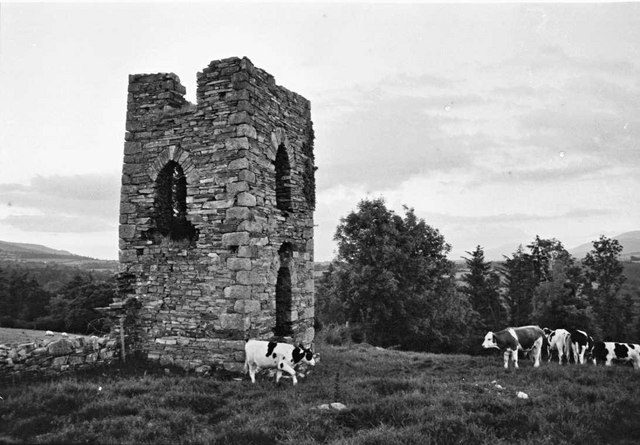
The square demesne tower

The castle consists of two towers: one, a circular keep, and the other, a square demesne tower located to the east.

The keep has a small southerly projection. The north doorway is protected by a machicolation and there is another to the east. A murder-hole guards the double entrance.

A mural helical stairway leads to the upper floors. The ground floor room has large alcoves. It has a vaulted ceiling with some wicker-marks. There are three storeys above the vault. There is a fireplace on the second floor. The third floor contains a fireplace, garderobe and separate stairs to the roof. There are single-light, round and cross-shaped loopholes.
