= John Bernardi =

Genoese-English army officer

Major John Bernardi (1657 – 20 September 1736) was an English soldier, adventurer and Jacobite conspirator. Bernardi is best known for his involvement in an assassination plot against William III, and his subsequent forty-year imprisonment, without proper trial, in Newgate prison.

== Early life ==
Bernardi was born in Evesham into a wealthy family of Genoese origin. His grandfather, Philip, and father, Francis, had both served as Resident of the Republic of Genoa, though after a disagreement the latter had retired permanently to Evesham.

John Bernardi's "restless" temperament, along with what he claimed was "harsh" treatment by his father, led him to run away from home at the age of 13. He later wrote that on going through the gate he "kneeled down protesting and praying that he might never return, whilst his father lived". After some time staying with Sir Clement Fisher, he eventually came to enlist as a common soldier in William of Orange's service, later exchanging into English service and eventually rising to the rank of Captain due to his bravery and "uncommon talents". He was wounded in 1674 at the Siege of Grave, received another wound preventing a duel, and at the Siege of Maastricht lost the sight in an eye and was shot through the arm, being rescued after being left for dead on the battlefield.

== Jacobitism ==
Bernardi married in 1677, to a Dutch woman from a respectably wealthy family. He was recalled from Holland in 1687 by James II, but at the 1688 Glorious Revolution he remained loyal to James and was therefore compelled to again leave the country, being given command of a Jacobite division on his arrival in France. In the aftermath of the Battle of Killiecrankie he was sent to Scotland to assist in organising Jacobite resistance in the Highlands, but the ultimate failure of James's campaign in Ireland led him to attempt escape southwards towards London, near where he was arrested while attempting to board a ship for Holland.

Initially charged with treason, Bernardi was subsequently released on parole to Holland after the bill was rejected. He shortly returned to England and for some time lived quietly near Brentford.

== Plot accusations and imprisonment ==
Around 1695 Bernardi began frequenting coffee-houses in London, where he came into contact with a variety of other Jacobite figures including his former commanding officer Sir John Fenwick and Ambrose Rookwood. In 1696 he was arrested in a tavern and charged with complicity in an assassination plot against William. Bernardi was later to claim that he was unaware of the plot and was only in Rookwood's company by chance when he was arrested, although his name had in fact been included in a prior government proclamation suggesting that the authorities had good information on his involvement.

While the principal conspirators were executed, Bernardi and five others (Robert Blackbourn or Blackburne, Robert Cassills or Cassels, James (alias John) Counter, Robert Meldrum and James Chambers) were held without coming to trial, initially for a year ostensibly to gather further evidence. However, their continued imprisonment was sanctioned by subsequent Acts, even after William III's death, although Counter was released by Queen Anne. This was the last ever recorded suspension of the Habeas Corpus Act. In 1727 Bernardi, Cassels, and Blackbourn submitted a petition for release, Meldrum and Chambers having died in the interim. They were, however, never brought to trial and never released, with Bernardi, said to be the last surviving conspirator, eventually dying at the age of eighty after nearly forty years' imprisonment. However a contemporary notice of Bernardi's death "in his chamber in the Press-Yard at Newgate" suggests that Blackbourn, one of the other conspirators, was still alive in Newgate at that time, and Biographia Britannica stated that out of clemency Blackbourn was subsequently moved to the more comfortable King's Bench Prison.

Bernardi and the other conspirators at Newgate were anonymously depicted, in complimentary terms, in the 1717 pamphlet The History of the Pressyard, supposedly written by an imprisoned participant in the Jacobite rising of 1715. Amongst other scenes "Mr. B[lackbour]n" and "the Major" (Bernardi) are shown earnestly discussing the tactical implications of the Battle of Preston, using a map drawn by Blackbourn. Their detention without trial was unprecedented in the period, and Bernardi was later suggested to have perhaps known some state secrets which, out of loyalty to James, he refused to divulge.

== Life in prison ==
Bernardi's life in prison was made difficult by effects of the old wounds he had sustained in the 1670s. Bernardi also complained that his confinement in the "dismal and loathsome" gaol had cost him "above seven hundred pounds for his lodging". Surprisingly, however, in 1712 not only did he marry again in Newgate at the age of sixty-eight, to a woman around forty-eight years younger (his first wife having died many years before) but he and his new wife went on to have ten children. What became of his family after his death is unknown. Bernardi, described by Biographia Britannica as a "little brisk man" of cheerful disposition, was said to have borne imprisonment with great constancy of mind and even published his autobiography, A Short History of the Life of Major Bernardi by Himself, regarded as fundamentally accurate if somewhat vain and boastful, in 1729. The autobiography includes an engraved portrait by Gerard Vandergucht after W. Cooper, as well as copies of his various petitions and those of his wife Abigail Bernardi.
