= Ambrose Rookwood (Jacobite) =

English Jacobite soldier and assassination conspirator

Ambrose Rookwood (1664–1696) was an English Jacobite soldier, a conspirator and commander in the assassination plot of 1696 intended to kill William III of Great Britain. He was convicted and executed.

== Life ==
Born on 20 September 1664, he was the son of Ambrose Rookwood (1622–1693) and Elizabeth Caldwell of Dunton, Essex, and great-grandson of Ambrose Rookwood the Gunpowder Plot conspirator. He entered the army, in which he rose to be brigadier under James II.

Rookwood remained an adherent of the House of Stuart, and early in 1696 Sir George Barclay enlisted his services in the plot to kidnap or assassinate William III. In February Thomas Prendergast, one of the conspirators, turned king's evidence, and the plot was revealed. On 27 March Rookwood was found in bed in a Jacobite alehouse, and committed to Newgate Prison.

On 7 April a true bill of high treason was found against Rookwood at the Middlesex county sessions. He was brought before the King's Bench on 21 April. His case, tried with those of Robert Lowick and Charles Cranburn who was a Jacobite quartermaster, was the first treason trial to use the new system of procedure brought in by the Treason Act 1695, which in particular allowed for defense counsel. Rookwood pleaded not guilty, and was defended by Sir Bartholomew Shower and Constantine Phipps. George Porter, one of the principal conspirators, gave evidence against him, and Rookwood was convicted.

Rookwood was executed at Tyburn on 29 April, with Lowick and Cranburn. In a manuscript which he gave to the sheriff at the place of execution, he excused himself. Some Observations on this paper were published in 1696.

== Notes ==
Attribution

This article incorporates text from a publication now in the public domain: Lee, Sidney, ed. (1897). "Rookwood, Ambrose". Dictionary of National Biography. Vol. 49. London: Smith, Elder & Co.
