= William Parkyns =

English lawyer and Jacobite conspirator

Sir William Parkyns or Perkins (1649?–1696) was an English lawyer and Jacobite conspirator, executed for high treason.

== Life ==
The son of William Parkyns, a London merchant, he was born in London about 1649. He was admitted to the Inner Temple in 1671, and was called to the bar in 1675. He was knighted at Whitehall Palace on 10 June 1681.

Parkyns acquired a good practice, and, inheriting wealth from his father, became prominent in the London as an adherent of the court party, an "abhorrer" at the time of the Exclusion Bill, and, after the Glorious Revolution, as an inveterate Jacobite. In fact, in order to retain his office as one of the six clerks in the Court of Chancery, he had taken the oath of allegiance to William III.

After the death of Queen Mary in 1695 Parkyns associated with Sir George Barclay, Robert Charnock, Captain George Porter, "Scum" Goodman, and others, in their plan to kidnap or to assassinate William. Their scheme was communicated to James II early in 1695, but no sanction to proceed in the matter was forthcoming from him. The plot was suspended on William's departure for Flanders in May. It was resumed on Barclay's landing in England in January 1696 with a commission from James. Barclay persuaded Parkyns that it was meant to cover an attack on the king's person.

Parkyns was too gouty to take a very active share, but he provided horses, saddles, and weapons for accomplices to the number of forty, and was promised a high post in the Jacobite army. On the discovery of the plot by Thomas Prendergast, active search was made for Parkyns. Nothing was found in his house in Covent Garden, but at his country seat in Warwickshire were revealed arms and accouterments sufficient to equip a troop of cavalry. On 10 March he himself was arrested in the Temple and committed to Newgate Prison.

The trial of Parkyns took place on 24 March. The new act for regulating the procedure in cases of high treason came into force on 25 March, and he pleaded hard that he ought to be tried under its provisions. But the counsel for the crown stood on their rights, and his request was denied. He defended himself, but the testimony of Captain George Porter, who had turned king's evidence, was explicit; he was found guilty and condemned to death. Efforts were made to induce Parkyns to confess what he knew, and a deputation of nine Members of Parliament visited him in Newgate. He confessed his complicity in the plot, but he would not name the five persons whom he was to send to assist in the assassination; he stated that he had seen James's commission, but refused to give the names of those whom he had nominated to commissions in his regiment. He gave some additional particulars to Simon Patrick, the Bishop of Ely, to whom he also confessed the irregularities of his life.

Parkyns was executed on Tower Hill, along with Sir John Friend, on 13 April 1696. His head was exposed on Temple Bar.

== Aftermath ==
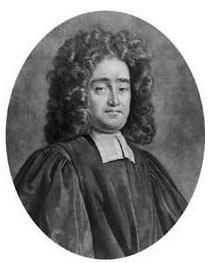
Jeremy Collier, one of the Non-Juror priests present at the execution of Friend and Parkyns

Three Non-Juror priests, Jeremy Collier, Shadrach Cook and William Snatt accompanied Parkyns and Friend to Tower Hill and immediately prior to the execution declared the two absolved of their sins. In doing so, they effectively declared the conspirators to be correct in their actions, whilst also performing a rite not recognised by the Church of England. This was condemned by both archbishops and ten bishops of the Church in a tract titled A Declaration concerning the Irregular and Scandalous Proceedings. Collier went into hiding and was outlawed, Cook and Snatt were tried, found guilty but released.

In his tract Defence of the Absolution published shortly after, Collier claimed Parkyns sent for him repeatedly in Newgate, asking for absolution by the church the day before his execution but he was refused admission to the prison. This was the reason why he went to Tyburn and given the absolution there; he also denied Sir William had admitted his guilt. No further action was taken against him.

== Family ==
By his wife Susanna, daughter and coheir of Thomas Blackwell of Bushey, Hertfordshire, whom he married at St. Mildred's, Bread Street, on 26 June 1673, Parkyns left a daughter. His nephew, Captain Matthew Smith, was another Jacobite intriguer.
