= Rosbercon Abbey =

Dominican Abbey at Rosbercon, County Kilkenny

Rosbercon Abbey was a Dominican Abbey at Rosbercon, County Kilkenny (Rosbercon is now in County Wexford). Founded in 1267, it was suppressed in 1539, and allowed to fall into ruin. A fragment of the Abbey survived as late as the 1820s, but no trace of it remains now.

The founders of Rosbercon Abbey were two prominent local families, the Walshes and Graces. It never seems to have been a religious house of any importance, and little is recorded about it until 1539, when Matthew Fleming, the last abbot, surrendered it to Henry VIII. The King granted it to John Parker, the Master of the Rolls in Ireland. It is unclear whether Parker, who lived near Dublin, intended to convert it into a country house, but in the event, it was left to decay.

A sketch of the Abbey, done in 1823, shows a small ruined building, with New Ross in the background.
