= John Morphew =

English publisher (died 1720)

John Morphew (died 1720) was an English publisher. He was associated with significant literary and political publications of the early 18th century. At one point publishing for both Whig and Tory factions, he later became identified with the Tories.

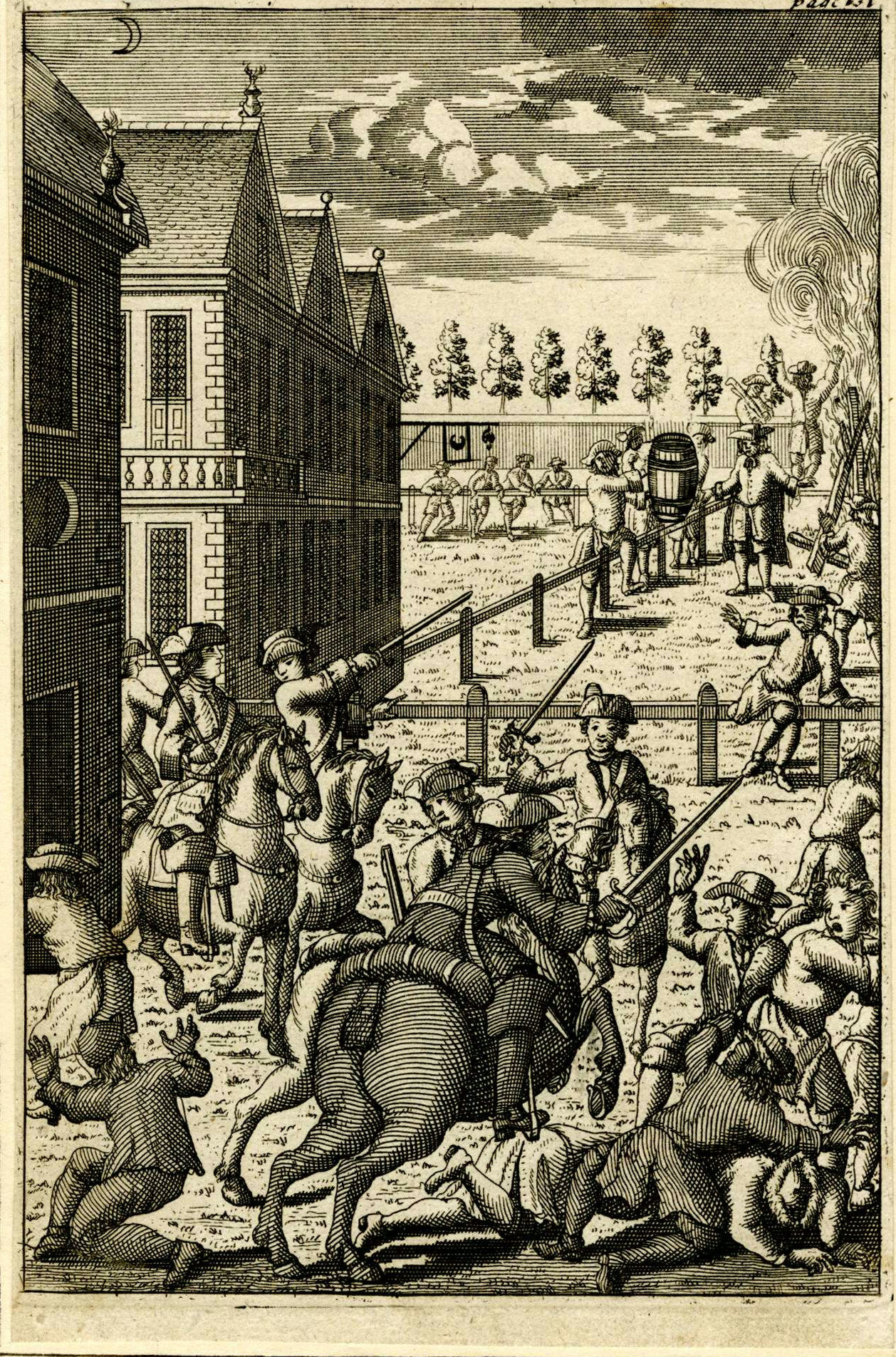
The Whigs Unmask'd (1713), satirical print of a 1712 riot, published by John Morphew.

== Life ==
Morphew as trade publisher (distributor) and John Nutt (printer) took over the business of Edward Jones when he died; this was in 1706. Previously Morphew had been a journeyman for Jones. At this period (i.e. from 1706) Morphew's name had replaced that of Nutt as imprint in most of Jonathan Swift's works. In 1707, Morphew began to publish periodicals. He also had a long working relationship with Delarivier Manley.

In 1709, Morphew was arrested by the government, with John Barber, and the publisher John Woodward; the charge arose from the publication of the second volume of Manley's New Atalantis. In 1710, he began publishing The Examiner for Swift. From 1710 also, Morphew, who was connected to the Tory administration, began working with Edmund Curll and producing political pamphlets. George Sewell, who had worked for Morphew as a hack writer, left to work for Curll. Morphew was also publisher of The Tatler, the real person mentioned alongside the fictitious Isaac Bickerstaff.

Morphew associated with the Scriblerus Club, and had some status as printer to the Tory ministry of the last years of Queen Anne. He took on, at some point, the publication of Abel Roper's Tory paper the Post Boy (1714). Shortly after the Hanoverian Succession in 1714, it gave offence to the government. At this juncture, Roper denied active involvement; and Morphew backed him up by stating that for while he had not accounted for the Post Boy's profits to Roper. Subsequently, Morphew lost some of his predominance as trade publisher to James Roberts, who identified more with the Whig cause. Material published in the Post Boy in the sensitive area of Anglo-Swedish relations, after the 1716 Jacobite plotting, caused Morphew to be arrested again in February 1717.
