= Rosbercon =

Village in County Kilkenny/Wexford, Ireland

Rosbercon Ros Bearrcon
- Village
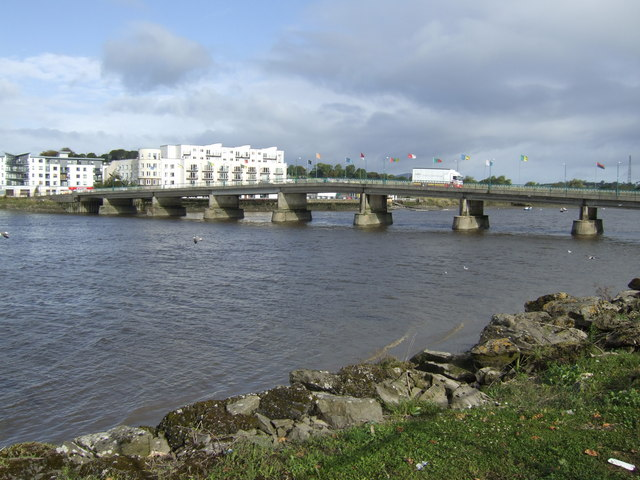
- Rosbercon is connected to New Ross via the Barrow Bridge

- Location in Ireland
- Coordinates: 52°23′44″N 6°56′42″W
- Country: Ireland
- Province: Leinster
- County: County Kilkenny & County Wexford
- Elevation: 75 m (246 ft)

Population (2022)
  - Total: 699
- Time zone: UTC+0 (WET)
  - Summer (DST): UTC-1 (IST (WEST))
- Irish Grid Reference: S715278

Rosbercon (Irish: Ros Bearrcon) is a village in Ireland, on the opposite side of the River Barrow from New Ross, County Wexford. Although the village was originally in County Kilkenny, much of it is now in Wexford for administrative purposes. It had a population of 699 at the 2022 census.

It has a large Roman Catholic church, two schools, and restaurants, Thai and Chinese, as well as a pub. The village shop closed in the summer of 2008. The Old Rectory, formerly a hostel for asylum seekers, was built on the site of the 13th-century Rosbercon Castle. The village grew up around the castle and Rosbercon Abbey, a Dominican house founded in 1267 and suppressed in 1539.

The village expanded by nearly 60% between 2002 and 2006, with between 34 and 46 per cent of its population being immigrants, chiefly from Poland and other Eastern European countries. There are a large number of new apartments by the river, many of them rented by members of the Polish community.

Rosbercon is in the ecclesiastical parish of Tullogher in the diocese of Ossory, and the main parish church is located in the village. The other churches of the parish are in Tullogher and Mullinaharigle, with additional graveyards at Shanbough and Ballyneale. It lies between the Barrow and Nore rivers, and is bounded by the parishes of Glenmore to the south and Mullinavat to the west and The Rower - Inistioge to the north and west. Although the easternmost part of the parish is now within the New Ross urban district, many of the residents identify with County Kilkenny, particularly in sporting matters.

In the building boom of the Celtic Tiger, many of the old buildings in the main street backing onto the River Barrow were demolished and have been replaced by modern apartment blocks and shops.

Townlands within Rosbercon Village include: Annfield (Kilkenny and Wexford), Garranbehy, Millbanks (Kilkenny and Wexford), Raheen (Kilkenny and Wexford and Rosbercon (Kilkenny and Wexford)

== See also ==
- List of abbeys and priories in Ireland (County Kilkenny)
- List of towns and villages in Ireland
