= The Examiner (1710–1714) =

1710–1712 paper edited by Jonathan Swift

The Examiner (originally titled Examiner, or Remarks upon Papers and Occurrences) was a newspaper commenced on 3 August 1710 and edited by Jonathan Swift from 2 November 1710 to 14 June 1711. It promoted a Tory perspective on British politics, at a time when Queen Anne had replaced Whig ministers with Tories. The paper ceased publication in July 1714 upon the death of Queen Anne and the accession of the Hanoverian King George I with the accompanying change of the ministry from Tory to Whig.

The newspaper was printed by John Morphew and it was launched by the Tories to counter the press of the Whig party. Before Swift, its editors included philosopher and politician Henry St John, 1st Viscount Bolingbroke, Francis Atterbury, chaplain of King William III, and the poet and diplomat Matthew Prior. Another notable contributor, who succeeded Swift, was Delarivier Manley.

In 1711, Swift published the political pamphlet The Conduct of the Allies, attacking the Whig government for its inability to end the prolonged war with France. The incoming Tory government conducted secret (and illegal) negotiations with France, resulting in the Treaty of Utrecht (1713) ending the War of the Spanish Succession.
