= Gervais Parker =

British Army general and Irish politician

General Gervais Parker (also spelt Gervase; 1695 – 19 June 1750) was a British Army officer. For the final decade of his life, he served as Commander-in-Chief of the Royal Irish Army during the reign of George II.

He was the elder surviving son of the Jacobite Colonel John Parker by his first wife Johanna Rouse. His younger brother, Rear-Admiral Christopher Parker, was the father of Admiral of the Fleet Sir Peter Parker, 1st Baronet. The family went into exile in France following Colonel Parker's service at the Battle of the Boyne, but Gervais escaped from his father and joined the English army.

Parker was commissioned an ensign in the 1st Regiment of Foot Guards on 27 December 1690, and his early career was assisted by his Williamite relatives. He was made lieutenant in Brigadier-General William Steuart's Regiment of Foot on 1 December 1695, then lieutenant in the Royal Fusiliers on 17 May 1697, being appointed adjutant and quartermaster of the regiment on 17 November 1700. He was made lieutenant of a company again on 21 April 1701, and his commission was renewed by Queen Anne on 24 August 1702. He was promoted to captain-lieutenant on 23 December 1702, and captain of a company on 15 March 1703. During the War of the Spanish Succession he served in Flanders and Spain. On 24 December 1707 he was granted brevet rank as a colonel of Foot, and promoted to brigadier-general on 14 March 1727, major-general on 6 October 1735, lieutenant-general on 2 July 1739 and general of Foot on 25 March 1747.

Parker, who had strong Irish connections (the Parkers had been major Irish landowners in the sixteenth century), was awarded the freedom of the city of Cork on 23 January 1726 and the same year made Governor of Kinsale, and on 22 October 1731 he was returned as Member for Kinsale in the Irish House of Commons, but he was declared not duly elected on 25 November. On 2 June 1740 he was admitted to the Privy Council of Ireland, He also served as Governor of Cork and commander-in-chief of the forces in Ireland until his death in 1750.

Gervais Parker had a son, also named Gervais, who served under him as fort-major at Kinsale but predeceased him on 4 August 1739.
