= John Parker (Jacobite) =

Professional soldier from London, and Jacobite activist

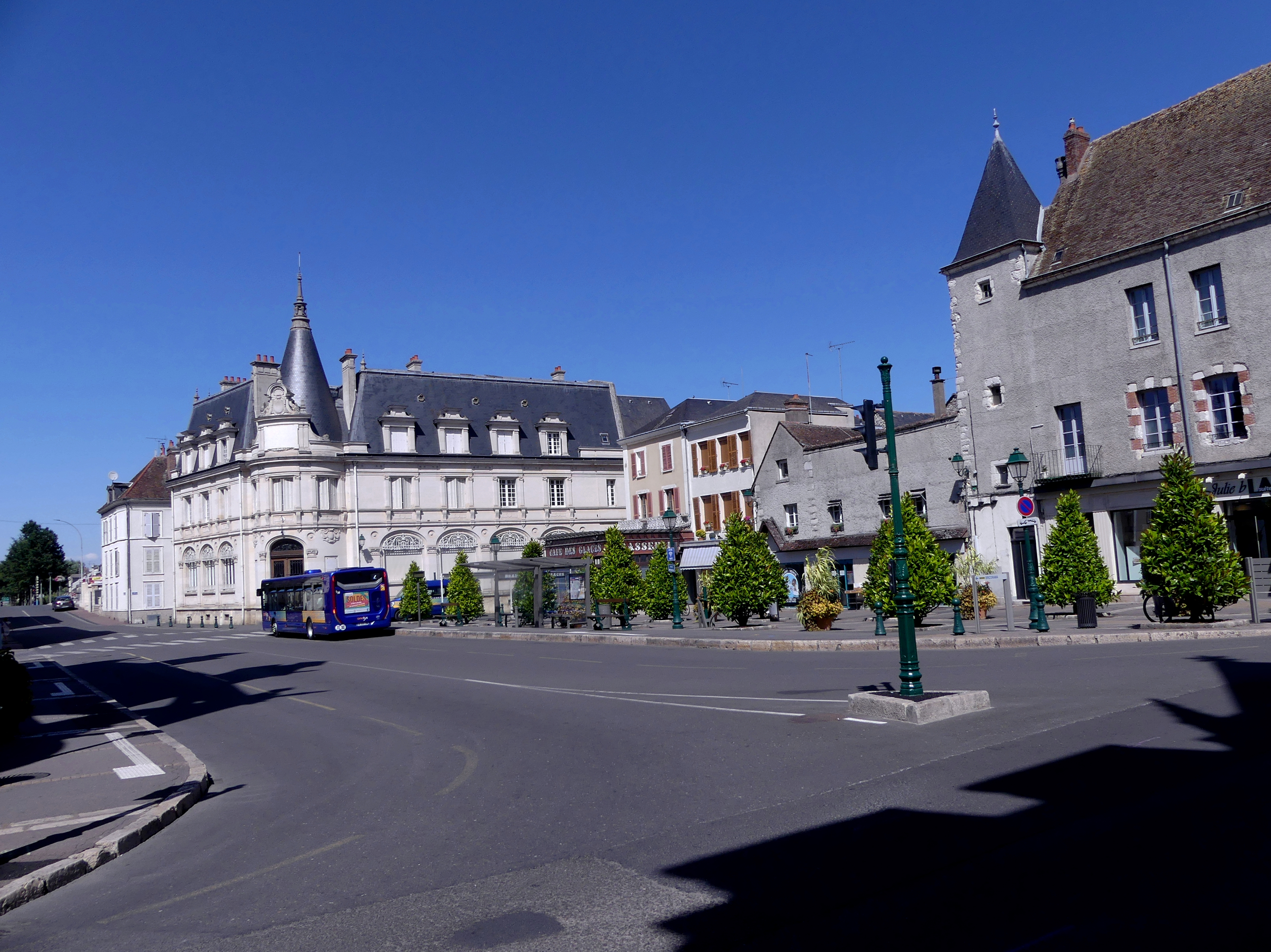
- Town square in Montargis, where Parker settled later in life

Personal details
- Born: c. 1651 London
- Died: After 1719 Montargis, France
- Spouse: (1) Johanna c. (1674-1685) (2) Trinder (1695-1696)? (3) Marie Millenges (d.1706) (4) Anne Bulstrode (1711-his death)
- Children: (1) Gervais (1675-1750), Christopher (1678-1765), plus two others (2) Two sons

Military service
- Battles/wars: Franco-Dutch War; Maastricht (WIA) (POW); Philippsburg; Monmouth Rebellion; Battle of Sedgemoor; Glorious Revolution; Williamite War in Ireland; Battle of the Boyne (WIA); Battle of Aughrim

John Parker (c.1651 – 1719) was a professional soldier from London and Jacobite activist. He later settled in France, where he died in obscurity sometime after 1719.

== Personal details ==
Parker was born c. 1651 in London, youngest of numerous children produced by William Parker (1610-1678), and his wife Judith (1619-after 1678). The family came from Kent, and his father held various offices under the Commonwealth prior to the Stuart Restoration in 1660. Their ancestor John Parker (died 1564) was Master of the Rolls in Ireland.

In 1674, Parker married Johanna Rouse (c. 1646-1685), and they had four children, including Gervais (1675-1750) and Christopher (1678-1765). Helped by their loyalist relatives, both had distinguished careers in the British Army and Royal Navy respectively, one of his grandsons being Admiral Peter Parker. A Miss Trinder became his second wife in 1694, and they had two sons before her death in 1696. He had two other wives, Marie Millenges (died 1706), and Anne Bulstrode (died 1730), but little is known of them.

== Career ==
When the Franco-Dutch War, began in 1672, England was allied with France, and a number of English units were raised for the French Royal Army. Parker obtained a position with a regiment recruited by the Duke of Monmouth, and although England made peace with the Dutch in January 1674, these troops continued fighting with the French. By 1676, he was a captain, and was wounded at the sieges of Maastricht and Philippsburg. In January 1678, Parker returned to London as England prepared to re-enter the war on the side of the Dutch.

He was given a commission in the Duke of York's regiment, but the conflict ended in October 1678 before seeing action. Parker now became a firm supporter of the future James II of England, fighting a number of duels with his political opponents, notably Thomas Tollemache in 1682. When James succeeded his brother Charles as king in 1685, Parker participated in the Battle of Sedgemoor that ended the Monmouth Rebellion, and by the end of 1687, he was Lieutenant Colonel of a dragoon regiment.

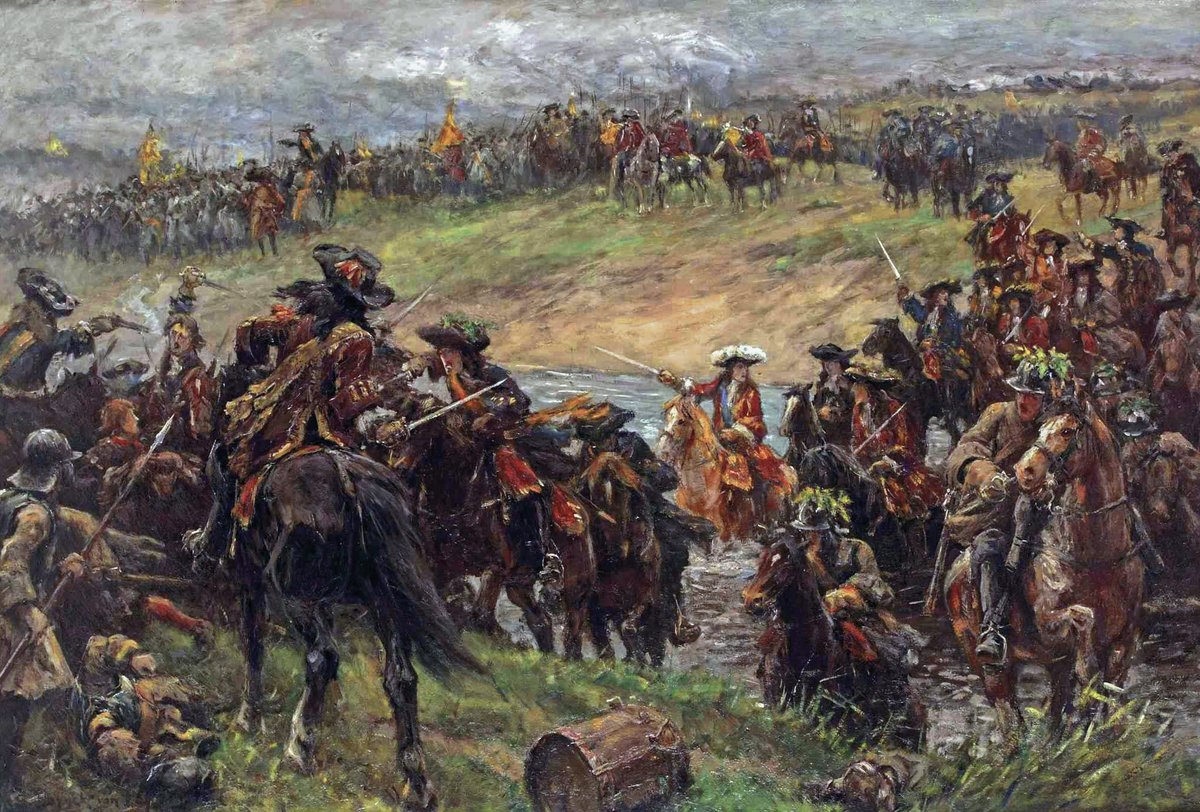
Williamite cavalry on the River Boyne, July 1690; Parker was badly wounded trying to prevent their crossing

After the November 1688 Glorious Revolution replaced James with his daughter Mary and her husband William as joint monarchs, Parker followed the deposed king into exile at St. Germain in France. When the latter sought to regain his throne by launching the Williamite War in Ireland in March 1689, he raised a troop of cavalry, and was badly wounded trying to prevent William leading his troops across the River Boyne in July 1690. He recovered and in 1691 took part in the Battle of Aughrim, another Jacobite defeat that ended the war in Ireland.

Although the Nine Years War continued, Parker became a full time conspirator, beginning with a 1692 French-directed attempt to assassinate William in Flanders. At some point in this period he converted to Catholicism, before returning to England, where he spent the next two years organising support for a potential invasion. Despite being tracked by the government, he lived openly in Lancashire, and had two sons with his second wife. Arrested in May 1694, he was sent to the Tower of London, but escaped in August.

Although not directly involved, Parker helped organise and recruit participants for another assassination plot in February 1696, and a reward of £1,000 was offered for his arrest. Shortly thereafter, he fell from favour with James' wife Mary of Modena and her favourite, the Earl of Middleton, and in August 1702 was sent to the Bastille. Released in 1704, he was banned from St Germain with a small pension, and secretly began negotiating a return to England. These talks came to nothing, and he returned to the exiled court in 1708, shortly before another unsuccessful invasion attempt.

His third wife, Marie Millenges, died in 1706, and in 1711 he married Anne Bulstrode, following the death of her father Richard (1610-1711), a Stuart loyalist, and veteran of the Wars of the Three Kingdoms. Not involved in the Jacobite rising of 1715, he lost his French pension and relocated to Montargis in 1716, where he seems to have died sometime after 1719, the date of his last recorded letter.

== Sources ==
- Ball, F. Elrington (1926). The Judges in Ireland 1221-1921. John Murray.
- Gibney, John (October 2009). "Parker, John". Dictionary of Irish Biography (online ed.). Royal Irish Academy.
- Hopkins, Paul (2004). "Parker, John". Oxford Dictionary of National Biography (online ed.). Oxford University Press. doi:10.1093/ref:odnb/21318. (Subscription, Wikipedia Library access or UK public library membership required.)
