= Richard Kingston =

Richard Kingston (1635? – 1710?) was an English political pamphleteer, clerical impostor, and spy.

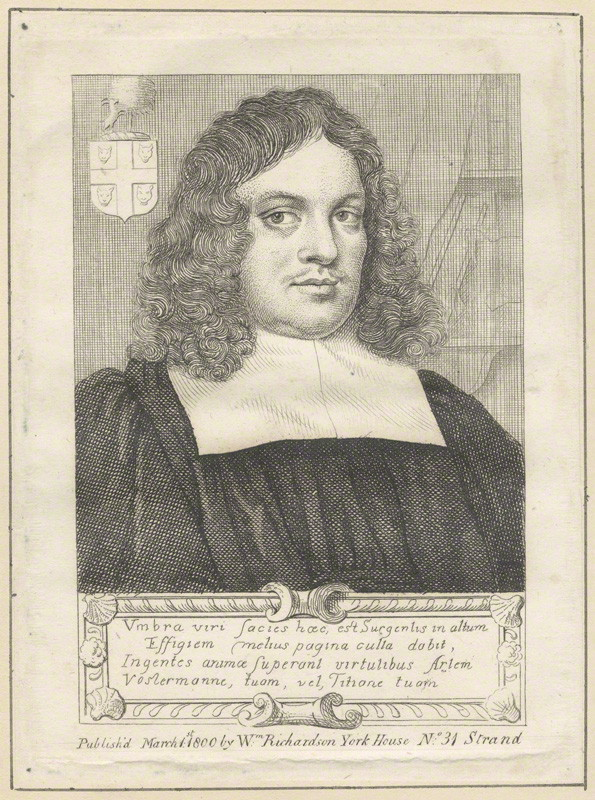
Richard Kingston, engraving from 1800.

== Life ==
He was born about 1635. According to his own statements he was a M.A., and was ordained by the Bishop of Galloway, 17 July 1662, at Westminster; and on 6 February 1682 was made chaplain in ordinary to Charles II. But Matthew Smith in 1700, when engaged with Kingston in a political controversy, charged him with having forged his letters of orders. Jonathan Trelawny in the 1680s, and Thomas Tenison in the 1690s, had become aware that Kingston was an impostor. He ceased to wear clerical dress. When Kingston published on the subject in 1700, he made an unconvincing case. He was son of a Northamptonshire farmer, who became a tailor's apprentice.

In 1665, Kingston was minister at St. James's, Clerkenwell, and worked during the Great Plague; Trelwany believed he was then a tailor, had found sermons, and preached in the absence of the incumbent. He had resigned this preferment before 17 September 1666, and took up a living at Irthlingborough, Northamptonshire, appointed by Nicholas Knollys who called himself 3rd Earl of Banbury. In 1678, he received the living of Henbury in Gloucestershire, possibly by purchasing the right himself. He asserted that a prebend and a rectory were added to Henbury. He remained there, on a small estate, till the Glorious Revolution, when he sold his property and moved to London.

For a period Kingston spied in London for the Jacobites. In 1692, he was discovered by the government agent John Macky, and was turned to spy for the other side. By the second half of the 1690s, he was working for Sir William Trumbull, and in the end his cover was blown when he testified in treason trials. He had a pension to write for the government, but it fell into arrears and he descended into poverty. A petition from him dated 1699 states that £600 was due to him.

In 1700, Kingston attacked Smith, who had just published his Memoirs of Secret Service, and a controversy ensued: Kingston attributed Smith's works to Tom Brown. Kingston also intervened in the controversy which raged in 1707–9 about the so-called French Prophets. In 1707, his attack on Dr. John Freind's vindication of the Earl of Peterborough's conduct in Spain appeared; he was arrested by order of the House of Lords. He was, however, released, 19 January 1708, and the attorney-general was instructed to prosecute him.

== Works ==
Kingston wrote:

- Pillulæ Pestilentiales, a Sermon at St. Paul's, London, 1665.
- The Cause and Cure of Offences, sermon, London, 1682.
- Vivat Rex, a sermon preached before the Mayor of Bristol after the discovery of the Rye House Plot, London, 1683.
- God's Sovereignty and Man's Duty asserted, London, 1688.
- A True History of the several Designs and Conspiracies against his Majesties Sacred Person and Government from 1688 to 1697, London, 1698. This work was intended to reinforce the credibility of John Lunt's alleged Lancashire Jacobite plot of 1694.
- Tyranny detected, and the late Revolution justified, London, 1699.
- A Modest Answer to Captain Smith's Immodest Memorial of Secret Service, London, 1700.
- Impudence, Lying, and Forgery detected and Chastiz'd, London, 1700, an answer to Smith, and a source of information respecting Kingston's history.
- A Discourse on Divine Providence, London, 1702.
- Impartial Remarks upon Dr. Freind's Account of the Earl of Peterborough's Conduct in Spain, London, 1706.
- Enthusiastick Impostors no Divinely Inspired Prophets, part i. 1707, part ii. 1709.
- Apophthegmata Curiosa, or Reflections, Sentences, and Maxims, London, 1709.

Kingston also mentions that he wrote a work called Cursory Remarks.

== Family ==
Kingston was twice married, as a bigamist, and in 1699 had nine children. He left his first wife Elizabeth Webb, and in 1668 eloped with the daughter of Rev. Arthur Leonard of Boughton, Northamptonshire. He married a second wife Elizabeth, who may have been this daughter.
