= James Fraser (minister) =

James Fraser (1700–1769) was a Scottish minister, known as a biblical critic in the Calvinist tradition.

== Life ==
He was born at the manse of Alness in Ross-shire, where his father, the Rev. John Fraser (died 1711), was minister from 1696. The father was seized with Alexander Shields in 1684, and was imprisoned in Dunnottar Castle 18 May 1685. He with his wife was among the hundred persons who were made a present of to George Scot of Pitlochie and shipped to New Jersey. There Fraser was set at liberty; went to New England, and preached as a licentiate at Waterbury, Connecticut. He returned to Scotland at the Glorious Revolution, was ordained, and settled first at Glencorse (1691–5), and later at Alness.

James Fraser, the son, was licensed by the presbytery of Chanonry 6 November 1723, and ordained 17 February 1726, becoming minister of Alness. Fraser was a regular correspondent of Robert Wodrow, to whom he suggested the preparation of his work on witchcraft. He died 5 October 1769. His widow, Jean Macleod, died 13 March 1778.

== Works ==
The treatise The Scripture Doctrine of Sanctification (Edinburgh 1774) was prompted by the view taken by John Locke of the fifth and sixth chapters of the Epistle to the Romans, Locke applying them solely to the Gentiles. Starting from this point, Fraser was led into an exposition of chapters vi. vii. viii. and a refutation of views of Hugo Grotius, Henry Hammond, Locke, Daniel Whitby, Jeremy Taylor, John Alexander, and others.
