= Robert Charnock =

Jacobite conspirator from Warwickshire, executed in 1696

Personal details
- Born: February 2, 1663 Wedgnock Place, Warwickshire
- Died: March 18, 1696 (aged 33) Tower Hill
- Spouse: Two unknown
- Education: Magdalen College, Oxford

Military service
- Battles/wars: Glorious Revolution; Williamite War in Ireland; Battle of the Boyne

Robert Charnock, 2 February 1663 - 18 March 1696, was a Jacobite activist and conspirator from Warwickshire, executed for his part in the unsuccessful 1696 Jacobite assassination plot.

== Personal details ==
Charnock was born 2 February 1663 at Wedgnock Place, Warwickshire, third of seven surviving children produced by Robert Charnock (died 1687), and his wife Margaret (died 1705). He was educated at Adams' Grammar School in Shropshire and Magdalen College, Oxford, from where he graduated in 1684.

== Career ==
In 1686, Charnock was appointed a fellow of Magdalen, and became heavily involved in the dispute between James II of England and the college over the election of a president. In April 1687, James ordered the fellows to elect Anthony Farmer, who was ineligible under the college statutes, and withdrew in favour of John Hough. Charnock acted as his agent in this process, and was the only fellow to vote in favour of Samuel Parker, who was ultimately elected president. James then demanded the fellows personally apologise on their knees for 'defying' him, and when they refused, the majority were expelled in November 1687.

Having converted to Catholicism, Charnock was appointed dean and vice-president of Magdalen in January 1688, but the collapse of royal authority meant he was expelled in October 1688. He received a military commission shortly before the Glorious Revolution in November 1688, and followed James into exile in France in December. He accompanied the latter when he landed in Ireland in March 1689, and served as captain in a cavalry regiment commanded by John Parker, which suffered heavy losses in the Jacobite defeat at the Boyne in July.

Residing at the court of the Stuarts in France, or conspiring in England, Charnock and Sir George Barclay appear to have arranged the details of the unsuccessful attempt to kill William III near Turnham Green in February 1696. It was Charnock whom the Jacobites sent to seek an audience with King James and ask for 10,000 French troops. The demand was refused as the troops were needed by the French on account of tensions with William III in the Low Countries. Barclay escaped, but Charnock was arrested, tried and found guilty. He was hanged on 18 March 1696.

The Tower of London Armoury in the White Tower has a blunderbuss labelled as belonging to Robert Charnock with which he intended to shoot King William III.

== Sources ==
- Harris, Tim (1993). Politics under the later Stuarts. Longman. ISBN 0-582-04082-5.
- Hopkins, Paul (2004). "Charnock, Robert". Oxford Dictionary of National Biography (online ed.). Oxford University Press. doi:10.1093/ref:odnb/5171. (Subscription, Wikipedia Library access or UK public library membership required.)
