= 1696 Jacobite assassination plot =

Jacobite assassination plot against William III of England

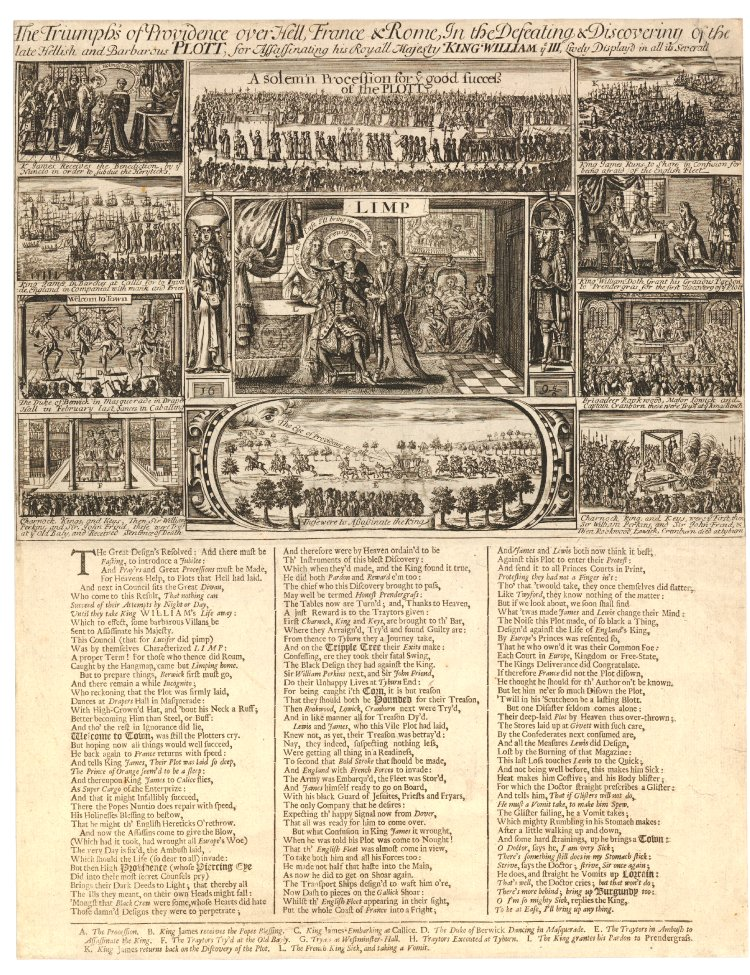
- The Triumphs of Providence, 1696 broadsheet celebrating William III's escape from assassination.
- Location: Between Turnham Green and Brentford
- Date: February 1696
- Target: William III
- Attack type: Assassination plot
- Perpetrator: Jacobites
- Assailants: John Bernardi; Robert Blackbourn; Thomas Bruce; Robert Cassels; James Chambers; Robert Charnock; James Counter; John Friend; James Grahme; William Herbert; Bevil Higgons; Thomas Higgons; Robert Meldrum; William Parkyns; Ambrose Rookwood
- Motive: To restore James II to the throne.
- Convictions: Treason, complicity in an assassination plot
- Convicted: 5, 6 detained indefinitely

The 1696 Jacobite assassination plot was an unsuccessful attempt in February 1696 to kill William III, and restore the exiled James II of England. The plot was discovered at an early stage of planning, and nine conspirators were executed for their participation.

== Background ==
The 1688 Glorious Revolution resulted in the exile of James II of England, who was replaced with his daughter Mary II, and her Dutch husband William III. Jacobite attempts to restore him included the 1689 to 1691 Williamite War in Ireland, and numerous conspiracies, the most serious being that attributed to the Earl of Ailesbury in 1692. However, the vast majority amounted to little more than talk, with planning hampered by internal rivalries, ubiquitous government informers, and James' own reluctance to sanction the killing of a fellow monarch.

Mary's death at the end of 1694 left William as sole ruler, and revived interest in direct action. The most active faction was led by Robert Charnock, who had served with the Jacobite cavalry in Ireland during the Williamite War, and his former colleague John Parker, who recruited George Porter and Sir William Parkyns. The group discussed a plan to kidnap William and smuggle him to France, but no action had been taken before the latter returned to Flanders in April 1695.

Sir John Fenwick, 3rd Baronet, a key advisor to James on English affairs, dismissed these arrangements as unfeasible. Following a meeting in May 1695 with Sir John Friend and others, he sent Charnock to the exiled court in St Germain with proposals for an invasion. To facilitate this, Fenwick and his conspirators would first secure a port in Southern England, allowing a French army to land, march on London and restore James. When Fenwick was arrested shortly afterwards, he was replaced by Sir George Barclay, who recognised these plans as hopelessly ambitious, and reverted to the original, and simpler, idea of assassinating William.

== Plan ==
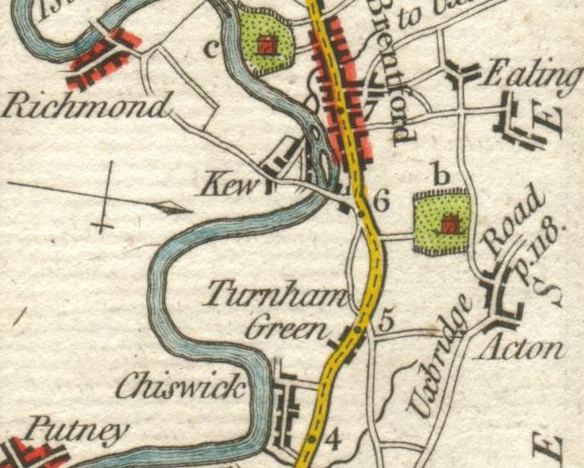
Map of the planned assassination attempt c. 1785. Kew Bridge was built post 1750, forcing William to cross by ferry

The plot was based on careful observation of William's habitual movements when returning from hunting. At Kew, he had to take a ferry across the River Thames, arriving on a lane running from Turnham Green to Brentford. Three armed groups led by Friend, Ambrose Rookwood, (Note: His great grandfather, another Ambrose Rookwood, had been executed for his part in the 1605 Gunpowder Plot) and Parkyns respectively, would ambush his coach and escort at a point in the lane narrow enough to prevent it from escaping.

The conspirators were ready to act on 15 and 22 February 1696, but William had been warned, and cancelled his hunting on both occasions. In fact, the Secretary of State for the Northern Department, William Trumbull, first learned of the plot in August 1695, before handing over the investigation to James Vernon. Sir Thomas Prendergast, (Note: Prendergast was made a baronet as a reward) whom Porter had attempted to recruit, provided details of the conspiracy to the Earl of Portland, implicating around 40 people in all. Fenwick caused Vernon some embarrassment by implicating members of the Whig Junto, including Godolphin, Marlborough, Orford, and Shrewsbury, his immediate superior.

== Aftermath ==
On 23 February 1696, warrants were issued for the participants, among them Friend, Charnock, Parkyns, and Rookwood, as well as sympathisers including James Grahme, Thomas Higgons, and Bevil Higgons, who were later released. On 21 March, Ailesbury was taken to the Tower of London, where he remained until February 1697. William Herbert, 2nd Marquess of Powis went into hiding, but surrendered in December 1696 and was held in Newgate Prison for about seven months.

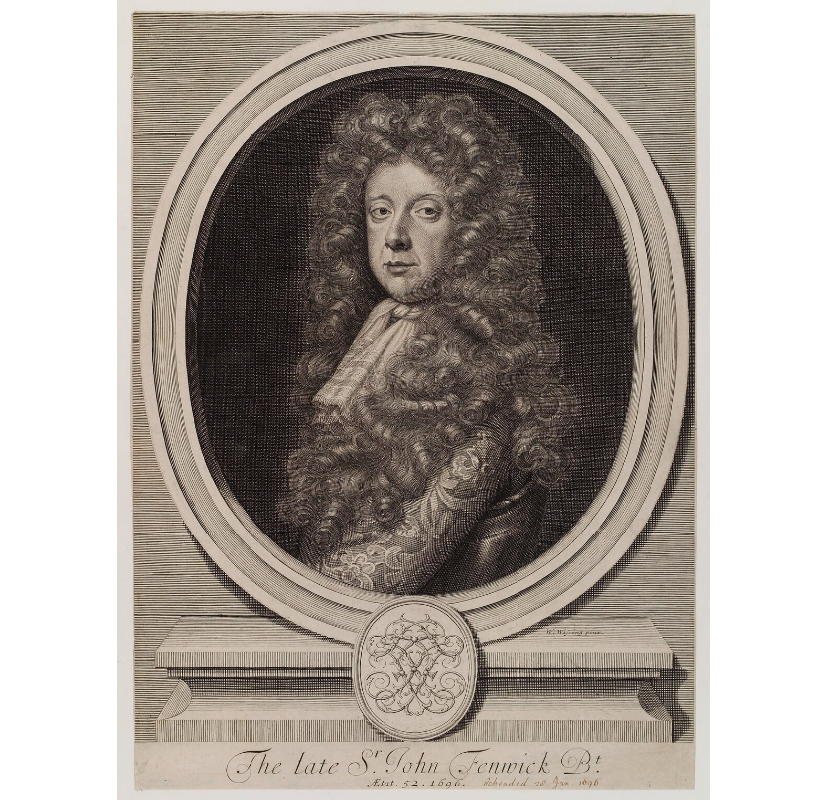
Sir John Fenwick, executed for his role in March 1697

Trials began in early March, Friend, Parkyns, and Charnock being denied defence counsel as their arrest predated the Treason Act 1695. All three were sentenced to death, the execution of Friend and Parkyns attended by three Non-Juror priests, Jeremy Collier, Shadrach Cook, and William Snatt. Rookwood was executed in April 1696, while Fenwick was convicted of treason, and executed on 28 January 1697.

Jacobite activists Robert Cassels, Robert Meldrum, James Counter, James Chambers, Robert Blackbourn, and Major John Bernardi were detained without trial indefinitely. Other than Counter, none was released; the last survivor, Bernardi, dying in 1736 while still in Newgate.

The failed plot prompted Parliament to approve additional funds for the Nine Years War against France. They also passed the Association of 1696, which was effectively a loyalty oath to William, while it was argued his preservation was due to divine providence, a counter to the argument that he was only entitled to the throne during the lifetime of his wife Mary.

== Sources ==
- Callow, John (2004). King in Exile, James II: Warrior, King and Saint, 1689–1701. Sutton Publishing. ISBN 0-7509-3082-9.
- Hanham, A. A. (2004). "Trumbull, William". Oxford Dictionary of National Biography (online ed.). Oxford University Press. doi:10.1093/ref:odnb/27776. (Subscription, Wikipedia Library access or UK public library membership required.)
- Hopkins, Paul (2009). "Charnock, Sir Robert". Oxford Dictionary of National Biography (online ed.). Oxford University Press. doi:10.1093/ref:odnb/5171. (Subscription, Wikipedia Library access or UK public library membership required.)
- Hopkins, Paul (2004). "Fenwick, Sir John". Oxford Dictionary of National Biography (online ed.). Oxford University Press. doi:10.1093/ref:odnb/9304. (Subscription, Wikipedia Library access or UK public library membership required.)
- Marshall, Alan (2008). "Vernon, James". Oxford Dictionary of National Biography (online ed.). Oxford University Press. doi:10.1093/ref:odnb/28243. (Subscription, Wikipedia Library access or UK public library membership required.)
- Mijers, Esther; Onnekink, David (2007). Redefining William III: The Impact of the King-Stadholder in International Context. Ashgate Publishing, Ltd. ISBN 978-0-7546-8639-2.
- Scott, Sir Walter; Somers, Baron John (1814). A Collection of Scarce and Valuable Tracts, on the Most Interesting and Entertaining Subjects: Reign of King William III (cont.). T. Cadell, W. Davies.
- Sirota, Brent (2014). The Christian Monitors: The Church of England and the Age of Benevolence, 1680-1730. Yale University Press. ISBN 978-0300167108.
- Stater, Victor (2008). "Bruce, Thomas". Oxford Dictionary of National Biography (online ed.). Oxford University Press. doi:10.1093/ref:odnb/3758. (Subscription, Wikipedia Library access or UK public library membership required.)
- Vallance, Edward (2005). Revolutionary England and the National Covenant: State Oaths, Protestantism, and the Political Nation, 1553-1682. Boydell Press. ISBN 978-1-84383-118-1.
