= The Rower =

Village in County Kilkenny, Ireland

The Rower An Robhar
- Village
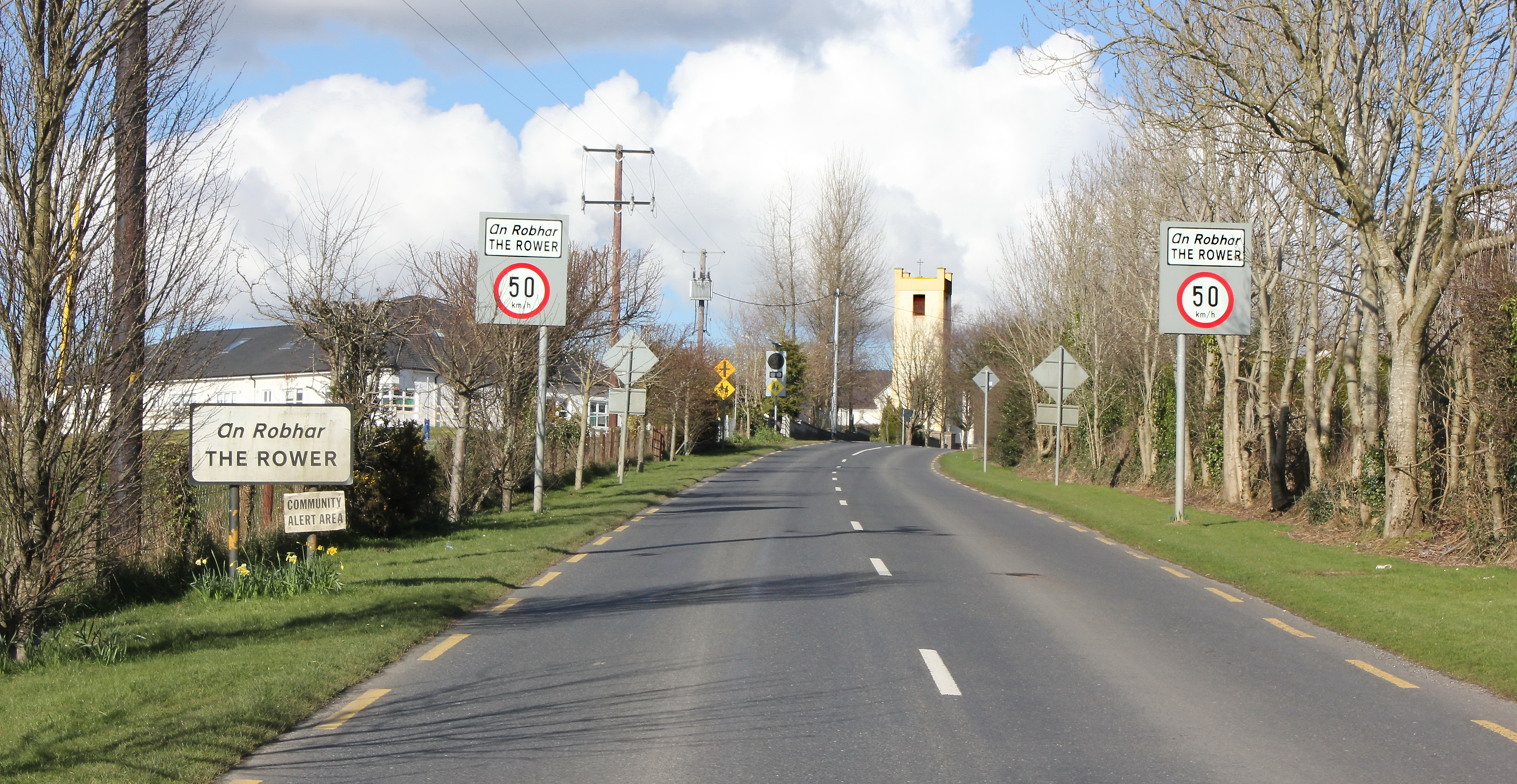
- Approaching The Rower from the south on the R705

- Location in Ireland
- Coordinates: 52°27′16″N 6°57′31″W
- Country: Ireland
- Province: Leinster
- County: County Kilkenny
- Time zone: UTC+0 (WET)
  - Summer (DST): UTC-1 (IST (WEST))

Rower or The Rower (Irish: An Robhar) is a small village in County Kilkenny, Ireland. The Rower is on the R705 regional road, roughly 30 km from both Waterford and Kilkenny. It is within the parish of the same name, which is about five miles (8 km) in length from north to south, by about three miles in breadth. It lies on the slopes of Brandon Hill and Cullintra Hill.

== History ==
Also historically as Roar, Rowar or Tamplerowar, Rower was a parish in the historical Barony of Ida. Within its limits was Ringwood, the seat of Lord Clifden, and an ancient residence of the Bolger family. The parish comprised 10,508 statute acres, as applotted under the tithe act, of which about 1,000 acres (4.0 km^{2}) consist of mountain, and a small portion of bog.

Nearby sites listed in the Record of Monuments and Places include a large circular enclosure or rath, recorded as a "possible ecclesiastical enclosure". Immediately to the southwest of this site is the ruined 19th century church and graveyard of the Rower Church.

== Amenities ==
The Rower has a primary school, two churches, a GAA field and community hall. The ruined castle of Coolhill, said to have belonged to the Butler family, is nearby; and there are several broken dolmens in the vicinity of Ballinabarna.

The community is represented by a hurling team which competes in the senior grade of Kilkenny GAA.

== See also ==
- List of towns and villages in Ireland
- Rower-Inistioge GAA
