= John Friend (conspirator) =

English Tory politician and Jacobite conspirator

Sir John Friend or Freind (died 1696) was an English Army officer, Tory politician, and Jacobite conspirator. He was executed in 1696 having been found guilty of high treason.

== Early life and political career ==
Friend was the eldest son of John Friend, a brewer, who resided in the precinct of St Katharine's by the Tower, London. He followed his father's business and in 1662 he became a member of the Worshipful Company of Brewers. He built the "stately brewhouse" called the Phœnix in the Minories, and amassed considerable wealth. As a member of a syndicate with Samuel Dashwood, he became a tax farmer in 1677. For a while he maintained a fine country residence at Hackney. In 1680, he was appointed a deputy lieutenant of Tower Hamlets.

In 1683, Friend was appointed a commissioner of excise. As Colonel of the Honourable Artillery Company (HAC), Friend, on occasion of their regimental feast, 26 June 1684, had the honour of entertaining James, Duke of York and Prince George of Denmark at a banquet in the Artillery Ground. Though a Protestant, he was a faithful adherent of James, by whom he was knighted 3 August 1685 following his accession to the throne. Friend was elected to the Loyal Parliament as a Tory Member of Parliament for Great Yarmouth in early 1685. He was a moderately active member, being appointed to five committees. In 1685 he was also appointed a justice of the peace for Middlesex.

== Jacobite conspirator ==
During the Glorious Revolution, Friend was ordered to call out the Tower Hamlets militia in defence of James II. Following William of Orange's seizure of the throne, Friend lost all of his public offices. He was expelled from the HAC at a meeting held in February 1689–90 and lost his seat at the board of excise. However, by a treasury order dated 18 December 1690, he was relieved from the payment of excise duties. As a High Tory, Friend refused to take the new oaths required under the Oaths of Allegiance and Supremacy Act 1688 and became a nonjuror.

James, by then in exile, sent Friend a colonel's commission to raise a regiment of horse in the event of the French pro-Jacobite landing in Kent; but Gilbert Burnet observed that, "his purse was more considered than his head, and was open on all occasions as the party applied to him". In 1694, a Jacobite conspirator reported that Friend remained influential in the London militia and that he "may be able to take possession of the Tower of London for the King" in the event of a Jacobite invasion. Friend apparently refused, however, to take any share in the assassination plot against the new king, William III, although he kept the plot secret.

== Arrest, execution and legacy ==
On the discovery of the assassination conspiracy, he was arraigned for high treason at the Old Bailey, 23 March 1696, and was denied the assistance of counsel by Chief-justice Sir John Holt. The Treason Act 1695 which allowed counsel in cases of treason came into operation two days later. Friend was convicted and sentenced to death; those arresting him had allegedly found "imprudent papers" in his possession. He protested that the witnesses against him "were Papists, and not to be believed against Protestants". He refused to betray his confederates to a committee of the House of Commons of England.

Together with Sir William Parkyns, Friend was executed at Tyburn 3 April 1696. They received absolution at the scaffold from three nonjuring clergymen. Before his execution, Friend gave a short speech affirming his belief that James II's deposition was unintelligible and that no power could "alienate our allegiance". Friend's remains were barbarously set up at Temple Bar, "a dismal sight", says Evelyn, "which many pitied". Aylmer, the bookseller, for printing Friend's trial, "wherein his lordship (i.e. Holt) is misrepresented," was arrested by order of Holt in May.

Friend was twice married. On his death, his share in the Phœnix brewhouse was sold for £5,500. According to Le Neve, "Mr. Gibbon, John, write a little pamphlet called the whole life & conversation of Sr Jo. friend." The name is spelt either "Freind" or "Friend".

Parliament of England
Preceded by George England; Sir James Johnson	Member of Parliament for Great Yarmouth; 1685–1687; With: Sir William Cook, Bt	Succeeded by George England; Samuel Fuller
