= George Barclay (Jacobite) =

Scottish army officer

Sir George Barclay (c. 1636–1710) was a Scottish army officer who headed a Jacobite assassination plot against King William II of Scotland in 1696. The plotters intended to ambush the king at Turnham Green in London on returning from a hunting party. The plot was betrayed to the government, and nine members were executed, though Barclay escaped to France.

Sir George Barclay is portrayed as the leader of a gang of pirates in Frederick Marryat’s novel Snarleyyow, or the Dog Fiend, following his escape. This is a fictional portrayal and does not constitute evidence of Barclay’s historical activities.
