= Bedford (disambiguation) =

Bedford is the county town of Bedfordshire, England.

- Bedford (UK Parliament constituency), the parliamentary constituency covering much of Bedford's built-up area
- Borough of Bedford, the local authority area covering Bedford, and surrounding towns and villages in north Bedfordshire

Bedford may also refer to:

== Places ==
=== Canada ===
- Bedford, Nova Scotia, a district and former town
- Bedford (provincial electoral district), Nova Scotia
- Bedford, Quebec (city)
- Bedford, Quebec (township)
- Bedford Basin, part of Halifax Harbour in Nova Scotia
- Bedford County, now part of Missisquoi County, Quebec

=== United Kingdom ===
- Bedford, Greater Manchester, a suburb of Leigh
- The Bedford Estate, a central London estate
- Bedford Level, an alternative name for The Great Level, a part of The Fens

=== United States ===
- Bedford, Indiana, a city
- Bedford, Iowa, a city
- Bedford, Kentucky, a home rule-class city
- Bedford, Massachusetts, a town
- Bedford, Missouri, an unincorporated community
- Bedford, New Hampshire, a town
- Bedford (town), New York
  - Bedford (CDP), New York, a census-designated place in the town
- Bedford, Ohio, a city
- Bedford County, Pennsylvania
  - Bedford, Pennsylvania, a borough, spa town, and the county seat
- Bedford County, Tennessee
  - Bedford, Tennessee, an unincorporated community in the county
- Bedford, Texas, a city
- Bedford County, Virginia
  - Bedford, Virginia, a town and the county seat
- Bedford, Wyoming, a census-designated place
- Bedford Township (disambiguation)
- Fort Bedford, a French and Indian War-era British military fortification located at the present site of Bedford, Pennsylvania
- Bedford Plantation, a Southern plantation in Natchez, Mississippi, on the National Register of Historic Places

=== Elsewhere ===
- Bedford, Western Australia, Australia, a suburb of Perth
- Bedford, Eastern Cape, South Africa, a town
- Bedford Island, Antarctica

== Buildings ==
- The Bedford, Balham, a public house and music venue in Balham, London
- Bedford Castle, a ruin of a medieval castle in Bedford
- Bedford Civic Theatre, a former theatre in Bedford
- Bedford Hospital, a general hospital in Bedford, England
- Bedford Provincial Hospital (Eastern Cape), a general hospital in Bedford, Eastern Cape, South Africa
- Bedford Hotel (Brighton), a hotel in Brighton
- Bedford Museum & Art Gallery, a local museum and art gallery serving North Bedfordshire
- Bedford (HM Prison), a prison serving Bedford and north Bedfordshire

== People ==
- Bedford (surname)
- Bedford Brown (1795–1870), American politician and United States Senator
- Bedford Jezzard (1927–2005), English footballer

== Schools ==
- Bedford College, Bedford, a further education college based in Bedford, England, founded 1959
- Bedford College of Higher Education, a former higher education college based in Bedford, England, active 1976–1994
- Bedford College, London, a university college in London, England, founded 1849, merged into Royal Holloway College 1985
- Bedford High School (disambiguation), various schools in England and the United States
- Bedford Modern School, a coeducational public school in Bedford, Bedfordshire
- Bedford School, a boys' public school in Bedford, Bedfordshire

== Sports ==
- Bedford Athletic, a rugby union team based in Bedford, Bedfordshire
- Bedford Blues, a rugby union club in Bedford, Bedfordshire
- Bedford F.C., a football club in Bedford, Bedfordshire
- Bedford Tigers, a rugby league club in Bedford, Bedfordshire
- Bedford Town F.C., another football club in Bedford, Bedfordshire
- Bedford Autodrome, a racetrack in Thurleigh, Bedfordshire
- Bedford Speedway, a clay racetrack in Bedford County, Pennsylvania

== Titles ==
- Duke of Bedford, a title created six times in the Peerage of England
- Earl of Bedford, a title created three times in the Peerage of England

== Transportation ==
- Bedford Avenue (Brooklyn), a major thoroughfare in New York City
- Bedford Highway, Nova Scotia, Canada
- Bedford railway station, a railway station in Bedford, England
- Bedford station (Virginia), a proposed Transdominion Express station in Bedford, Virginia

== Other uses ==
- HMS Bedford, the name of several ships
- USS Bedford, a fictitious ship in the 1965 movie The Bedford Incident
- RAE Bedford, a research site of the Royal Aircraft Establishment between 1946 and 1994 near Thurleigh, Bedfordshire
- HM Prison Bedford, a Category B men's prison in Bedford, Bedfordshire, England
- Bedford Institute of Oceanography, a Government of Canada ocean research facility in Dartmouth, Nova Scotia
- Bedford Vehicles, a former British manufacturer of trucks and commercial vehicles
- Harpur Trust, a.k.a. The Bedford Charity, a charity based in Bedford, Bedfordshire
- Bedford cord, a heavy fabric resembling corduroy
- Bedford crop or Bedford level, an eponymous hairstyle, named after Francis Russell, 5th Duke of Bedford

== See also ==
- Bedford Flag, an 18th-century military flag associated with Bedford, Massachusetts
- Bedford Shale, a shale geologic formation in the states of Ohio, Michigan, Pennsylvania, Kentucky, West Virginia, and Virginia
- H. K Bedford, a former passenger and trade ship
- New Bedford (disambiguation)
- Bedford Park (disambiguation)
