= Cædmon =

Ancient English poet

Saint Cædmon of Whitby OSB
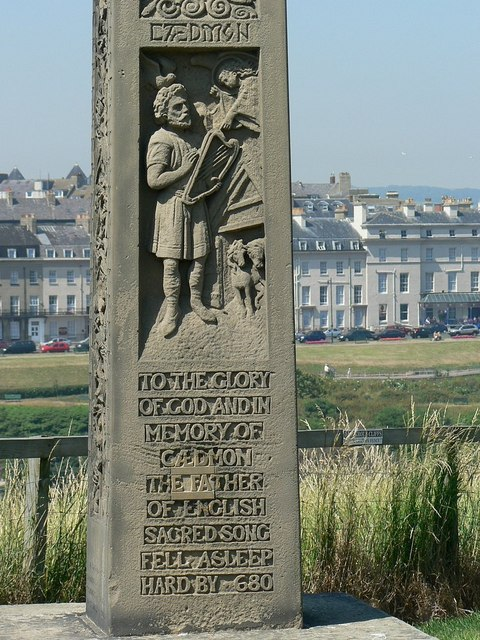
- Memorial to Cædmon, St Mary's Churchyard, Whitby.
- Died: c. 684
- Venerated in: Anglican Communion; Roman Catholic Church; Eastern Orthodox Church
- Feast: 11 February
- Major works: Cædmon's Hymn

Cædmon, OSB (/ˈkædmən, ˈkædmɒn/; fl. c. 657–684) was a Benedictine monk and the earliest English poet whose name is known. He was a Northumbrian cowherd who cared for the animals at the double monastery of Streonæshalch (now known as Whitby Abbey) during the abbacy of Hilda. He was originally ignorant of "the art of song" but learned to compose one night in the course of a dream, according to the 8th-century Christian historian Bede. He is venerated as a saint in the Eastern Orthodox Church, Catholic Church and Anglicanism, with a feast day on 11 February.

Cædmon is one of twelve Anglo-Saxon poets identified in medieval sources, and one of three of these for whom both roughly contemporary biographical information and examples of literary output have survived. His story is related in the Historia ecclesiastica gentis Anglorum ("Ecclesiastical History of the English People") by Bede, who wrote, "[t]here was in the Monastery of this Abbess a certain brother particularly remarkable for the Grace of God, who was wont to make religious verses, so that whatever was interpreted to him out of scripture, he soon after put the same into poetical expressions of much sweetness and humility in Old English, which was his native language. By his verse the minds of many were often excited to despise the world, and to aspire to heaven."

Cædmon's only known surviving work is Cædmon's Hymn, a nine-line alliterative vernacular praise poem in honour of God. The poem is one of the early attested examples of Old English and is, with the runic Ruthwell Cross and Franks Casket inscriptions, one of three candidates for the earliest attested example of Old English poetry. It is also one of the early recorded examples of sustained poetry in a Germanic language. In 1898, Cædmon's Cross was erected in his honour in the graveyard of St Mary's Church in Whitby.

== Life ==
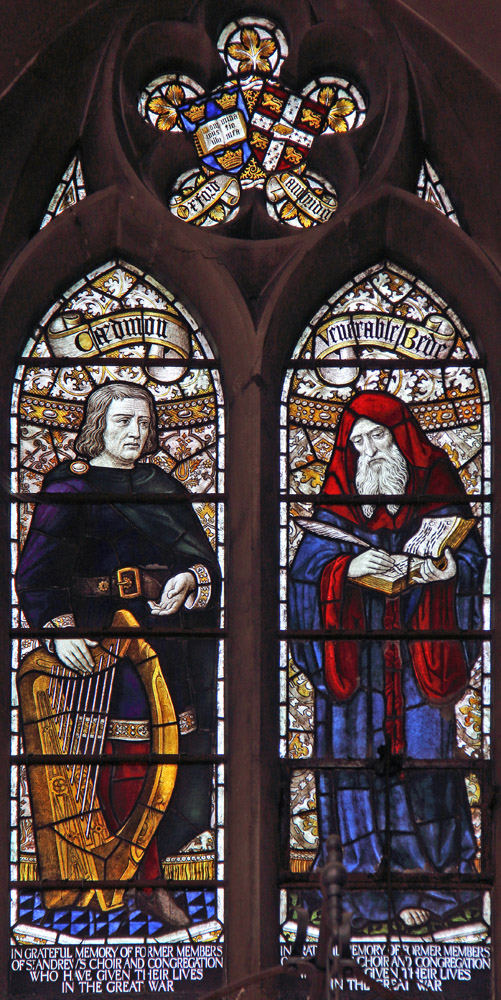
Caedmon and Bede depicted in stained glass at St Andrew, Stoke Newington.

=== Bede's account ===
The sole source of original information about Cædmon's life and work is Bede's Historia ecclesiastica. According to Bede, Cædmon was a lay brother who cared for the animals at the monastery Streonæshalch (now known as Whitby Abbey). One evening, while the monks were feasting, singing, and playing a harp, Cædmon left early to sleep with the animals because he knew no songs. The impression clearly given by Bede is that he lacked the knowledge of how to compose the lyrics to songs. While asleep, he had a dream in which "someone" (quidam) approached him and asked him to sing principium creaturarum, "the beginning of created things." After first refusing to sing, Cædmon subsequently produced a short eulogistic poem praising God, the Creator of heaven and earth.

Upon awakening the next morning, Caedmon remembered everything he had sung and added additional lines to his poem. He told his foreman about his dream and gift and was taken immediately to see the abbess, believed to be Hilda of Whitby. The abbess and her counsellors asked Cædmon about his vision and, satisfied that it was a gift from God, gave him a new commission, this time for a poem based on "a passage of sacred history or doctrine", by way of a test.

When Cædmon returned the next morning with the requested poem, he was invited to take monastic vows. The abbess ordered her scholars to teach Cædmon sacred history and doctrine, which after a night of thought, Bede records, Cædmon would turn into the most beautiful verse. According to Bede, Cædmon was responsible for a large number of splendid vernacular poetic texts on a variety of Christian topics.

After a long and zealously pious life, Cædmon died like a saint: receiving a premonition of death, he asked to be moved to the abbey's hospice for the terminally ill where, having gathered his friends around him, he died after receiving the Holy Eucharist, just before nocturns. Although he is often listed as a saint, this is not confirmed by Bede and it has been argued that such assertions are incorrect.

The details of Bede's story, and in particular of the miraculous nature of Cædmon's poetic inspiration, are not generally accepted by scholars as being entirely accurate, but there seems no good reason to doubt the existence of a poet named Cædmon. Bede's narrative has to be read in the context of the Christian belief in miracles, and it shows at the very least that Bede, an educated and intelligent man, believed Cædmon to be an important figure in the history of English intellectual and religious life.

=== Dates ===
Bede gives no specific dates in his story. Cædmon is said to have taken holy orders at an advanced age and it is implied that he lived at Streonæshalch at least in part during Hilda's abbacy (657–680). Book IV Chapter 25 of the Historia ecclesiastica appears to suggest that Cædmon's death occurred at about the same time as the fire at Coldingham Abbey, an event dated in the E text of the Anglo-Saxon Chronicle to 679, but after 681 by Bede.

The reference to his temporibus "at this time" in the opening lines of Chapter 25 may refer more generally to Cædmon's career as a poet. However, the next datable event in the Historia ecclesiastica is King Ecgfrith's raid on Ireland in 684 (Book IV, Chapter 26). Taken together, this evidence suggests an active period beginning between 657 and 680 and ending between 679 and 684.

=== Modern discoveries ===
The only biographical or historical information that modern scholarship has been able to add to Bede's account concerns the Brittonic origins of the poet's name. Although Bede specifically notes that English was Cædmon's "own" language, the poet's name is of Celtic origin: from Proto-Welsh *Cadṽan (from Brythonic *Catumandos). Several scholars have suggested that Cædmon himself may have been bilingual on the basis of this etymology, Hilda's close contact with Celtic political and religious hierarchies, and some (not very close) analogues to the Hymn in Old Irish poetry. Other scholars have noticed a possible onomastic allusion to 'Adam Kadmon' in the poet's name, perhaps suggesting that the entire story is allegorical.

=== Other medieval sources ===
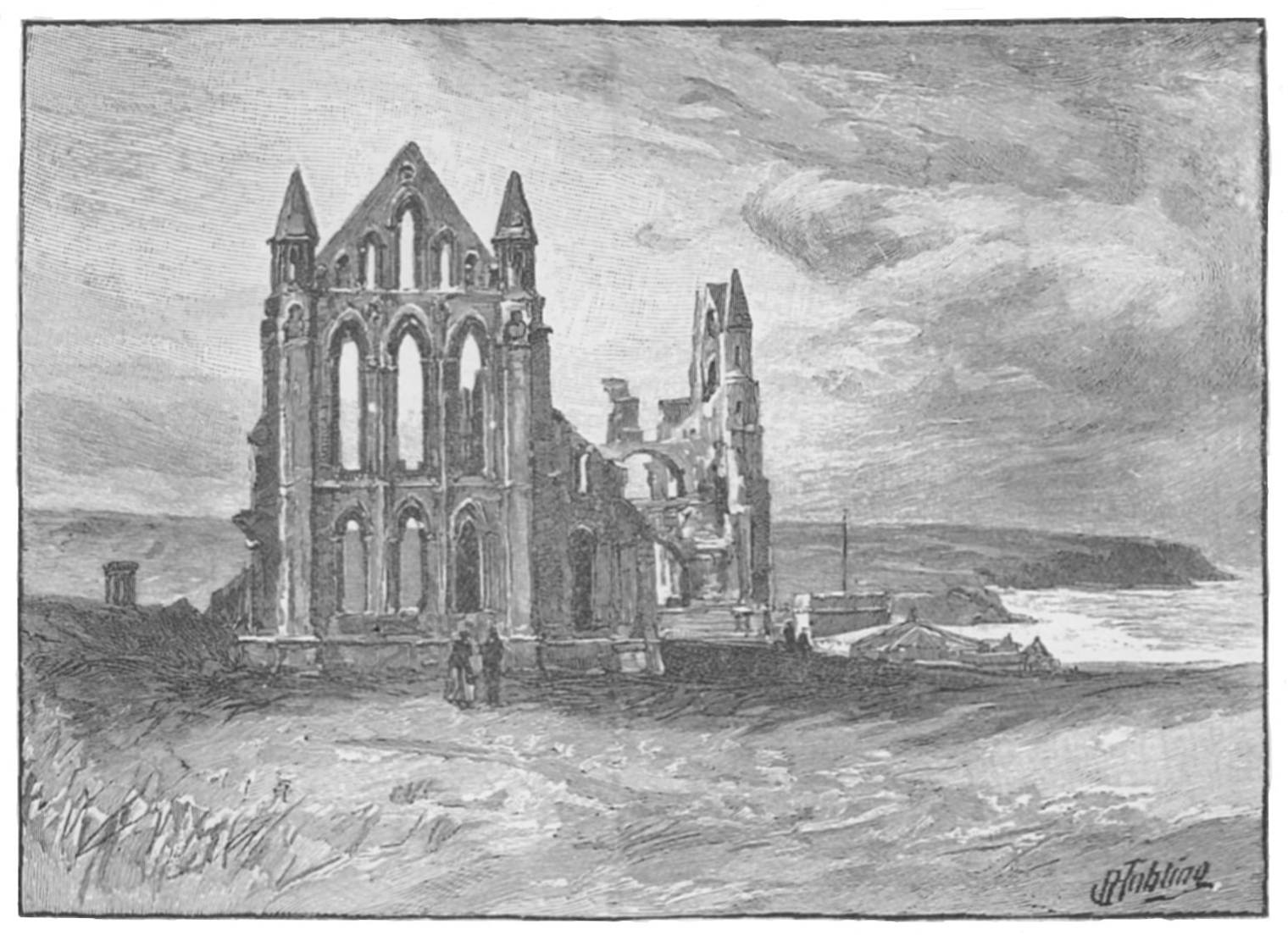
Ruins of Whitby Abbey in North Yorkshire, England— founded in 657 by Hilda, the original abbey fell to a Viking attack in 867 and was abandoned. It was re-established in 1078 and flourished until 1540 when it was destroyed by Henry VIII.

No other independent accounts of Cædmon's life and work are known to exist. The only other reference to Cædmon in English sources before the 12th century is found in the 10th-century Old English translation of Bede's Latin Historia. Otherwise, no mention of Cædmon is found in the corpus of surviving Old English. The Old English translation of the Historia ecclesiastica does contain several minor details not found in Bede's Latin original account.

Of these, the most significant is that Cædmon felt "shame" for his inability to sing vernacular songs before his vision, and the suggestion that Hilda's scribes copied down his verse æt muðe "from his mouth". These differences are in keeping with the Old English translator's practice in reworking Bede's Latin original, however, and need not, as Wrenn argues, suggest the existence of an independent English tradition of the Cædmon story.

==== Heliand ====
A second, possibly pre-12th-century allusion to the Cædmon story is found in two Latin texts associated with the Old Saxon Heliand poem. These texts, the Praefatio (Preface) and Versus de Poeta (Lines about the poet), explain the origins of an Old Saxon biblical translation (for which the Heliand is the only known candidate) in language strongly reminiscent of, and indeed at times identical to, Bede's account of Cædmon's career. According to the prose Praefatio, the Old Saxon poem was composed by a renowned vernacular poet at the command of the emperor Louis the Pious. The text then adds that this poet had known nothing of vernacular composition until he was ordered to translate the precepts of sacred law into vernacular song in a dream.

The Versus de Poeta contain an expanded account of the dream itself, adding that the poet had been a herdsman before his inspiration and that the inspiration itself had come through the medium of a heavenly voice when he fell asleep after pasturing his cattle. While our knowledge of these texts is based entirely on a 16th-century edition by Flacius Illyricus, both are usually assumed on semantic and grammatical grounds to be of medieval composition. This apparent debt to the Cædmon story agrees with semantic evidence attested to by Green demonstrating the influence of Old English biblical poetry and terminology on early continental Germanic literatures.

=== Sources and analogues ===
In contrast to his usual practice elsewhere in the Historia ecclesiastica, Bede provides no information about his sources for the Cædmon story. Since a similar paucity of sources is also characteristic of other stories from Whitby Abbey in his work, this may indicate that his knowledge of Cædmon's life was based on tradition current at his home monastery in (relatively) nearby Wearmouth-Jarrow.

Perhaps as a result of this lack of documentation, scholars have devoted considerable attention since the 1830s to tracking down possible sources or analogues to Bede's account. These parallels have been drawn from all around the world, including biblical and classical literature, stories told by the aboriginal peoples of Australia, North America and the Fiji Islands, mission-age accounts of the conversion of the Xhosa in Southern Africa, the lives of English romantic poets, and various elements of Hindu and Muslim scripture and tradition.

Although the search was begun by scholars such as Sir Francis Palgrave, who hoped either to find Bede's source for the Cædmon story or to demonstrate that its details were so commonplace as to hardly merit consideration as legitimate historiography, subsequent research has instead ended up demonstrating the uniqueness of Bede's version: as Lester shows, no "analogue" to the Cædmon story found before 1974 mirrors Bede's chapter in more than about half its main properties; the same observation can be extended to cover all analogues since identified.

== Work ==
=== General corpus ===
Bede's account indicates that Cædmon was responsible for the composition of a large oeuvre of vernacular religious poetry. In contrast to Saints Aldhelm and Dunstan, Cædmon's poetry is said to have been exclusively religious. Bede reports that Cædmon "could never compose any foolish or trivial poem, but only those which were concerned with devotion", and his list of Cædmon's output includes work on religious subjects only: accounts of creation, translations from the Old and New Testaments, and songs about the "terrors of future judgment, horrors of hell, ... joys of the heavenly kingdom, ... and divine mercies and judgments."

Of this corpus, only his first poem survives. While vernacular poems matching Bede's description of several of Cædmon's later works are found in London, British Library, Junius 11, traditionally referred to as the "Junius" or "Cædmon" manuscript, the older traditional attribution of these texts to Cædmon or Cædmon's influence cannot stand. The poems show significant stylistic differences both internally and with Cædmon's original Hymn, and there is nothing about their order or content to suggest that they could not have been composed and anthologised without any influence from Bede's discussion of Cædmon's oeuvre.

The first three Junius poems are in their biblical order and, while Christ and Satan could be understood as partially fitting Bede's description of Cædmon's work on future judgment, pains of hell and joys of the heavenly kingdom, the match is not exact enough to preclude independent composition. As Fritz and Day have shown, Bede's list itself may owe less to direct knowledge of Cædmon's actual output than to traditional ideas about the subjects fit for Christian poetry or the order of the catechism. Similar influences may, of course, also have affected the makeup of the Junius volume.

=== Cædmon's Hymn ===
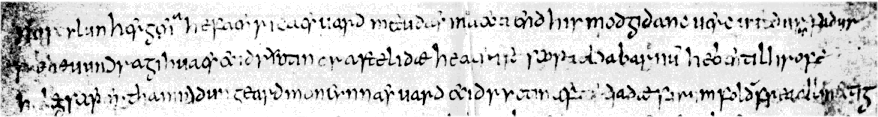
One of two candidates for the earliest surviving copy of Cædmon's Hymn is found in "The Moore Bede" (ca. 737) which is held by the Cambridge University Library (Kk. 5. 16, often referred to as M). The other candidate is the Saint Petersburg Bede Saint Petersburg, National Library of Russia, lat. Q. v. I. 18 (P)

The only known survivor from Cædmon's oeuvre is his Hymn (audio version). The poem is known from 21 manuscript copies, making it the best-attested Old English poem after Bede's Death Song (with 35 witnesses) and the best attested in the poetic corpus in manuscripts copied or owned in the British Isles during the Anglo-Saxon period. The Hymn also has by far the most complicated known textual history of any surviving Old English poem.

It is found in two dialects and five distinct recensions (Northumbrian aelda, Northumbrian eordu, West-Saxon eorðan, West-Saxon ylda, and West-Saxon eorðe), all but one of which are known from three or more witnesses. It is one of the early attested examples of written Old English and one of the early recorded examples of sustained poetry in a Germanic language. Together with the runic Ruthwell Cross and Franks Casket inscriptions, Cædmon's Hymn is one of three candidates for the early attested example of Old English poetry.

There is continuing critical debate about the status of the poem as it is now available to us. While some scholars accept the texts of the Hymn as more or less accurate transmissions of Cædmon's original, others argue that they originated as a back-translation from Bede's Latin, and that there is no surviving witness to the original text.

==== Manuscript evidence ====
All copies of Hymn are found in manuscripts of the Historia ecclesiastica or its translation, where they serve as either a gloss to Bede's Latin translation of the Old English poem, or, in the case of the Old English version, a replacement for Bede's translation in the main text of the History. Despite this close connection with Bede's work, the Hymn does not appear to have been transmitted with the Historia ecclesiastica regularly until relatively late in its textual history. Scribes other than those responsible for the main text often copy the vernacular text of the Hymn in manuscripts of the Latin Historia. In three cases, Oxford, Bodleian Library, Laud Misc. 243, Oxford, Bodleian Library, Hatton 43, and Winchester, Cathedral I, the poem is copied by scribes working a quarter-century or more after the main text was first set down.

Even when the poem is in the same hand as the manuscript's main text, there is little evidence to suggest that it was copied from the same exemplar as the Latin Historia: nearly identical versions of the Old English poem are found in manuscripts belonging to different recensions of the Latin text; closely related copies of the Latin Historia sometimes contain very different versions of the Old English poem. With the exception of the Old English translation, no single recension of the Historia ecclesiastica is characterised by the presence of a particular recension of the vernacular poem.

==== Earliest text ====
The oldest known version of the poem is the Northumbrian aelda recension. The surviving witnesses to this text, Cambridge, University Library, Kk. 5. 16 (M) and Saint Petersburg, National Library of Russia, lat. Q. v. I. 18 (P), date to at least the mid-8th century. M in particular is traditionally ascribed to Bede's own monastery and lifetime, though there is little evidence to suggest it was copied much before the mid-8th century.

The following text, first column on the left below, has been transcribed from M (mid-8th century; Northumbria). The text has been normalised to show a line-break between each line and modern word-division. A transcription of the likely pronunciation of the text in the early 8th-century Northumbrian dialect in which the text is written is included, along with a modern English translation. Note that some liberties must be taken with respect to the exact quality of some sounds, even beyond the alternatives given in parentheses & brackets (the former for optional sounds & the latter for necessary). Stress markers are added only for correspondence to stressed "lifts" in the Old English meter, and syllable boundaries are similarly not indicated for resolved syllables.

nu scylun hergan hefaenricaes uard metudæs maecti end his modgidanc uerc uuldurfadur swe he uundra gihwaes eci dryctin or astelidæ he aerist scop aelda barnum heben til hrofe haleg scepen. tha middungeard moncynnæs uard eci dryctin æfter tiadæ firum foldu frea allmectig	[nuː sçy.lʊn ˈhe.rʝɑ(n) ‖ ˈhe[v/β]ænˌriː.cæs ˈwɑrˠd ˈmetʊ.dæs ˈmæç.tɪː ‖ ɛnd his ˈmoːd.ʝɪˈθɔŋk ˈwerk(ʲ) ˈwuɫdrˌfɑ.dʊr ‖ sweː heː ˈwun.drɑː ʝɪˈ(x)ʍæs ˈeː.cɪː ˈdryç.tɪn ‖ ˈoːr ɑ(ː)ˈstelɪ.dæː heː ˈæː.rɪst ˈsçoːp ‖ ˈæl.dɑː ˈbɑrˠ.num ˈhe[v/β]æn til ˈ(x)r̥oː.væː ‖ ˈhɑː.lɛʝ ˈsçep.pɛnd θɑː ˈmid.d[ɑ/ʊ]nˈʝæ͜ɑrˠd ‖ ˈmɔnˌkyn.næs ˈwɑrˠd ˈeː.cɪː ˈdryç.tɪn ‖ ˈæf.tær ˈtiː͜ɑ.dæː ˈfiː.rum ˈfoɫ.dʊ ‖ ˈfræ͜ːɑ ˈɑɫˌmeç.tiʝ]	Now [we] must honour the guardian of heaven, the might of the architect, and his mind's purpose, the work of the father of glory — as he the beginning of wonders established, the eternal lord, He first created for the children of men heaven as a roof, the holy creator Then the middle earth, the guardian of mankind the eternal lord, afterwards appointed the lands for men, the Lord almighty.

Bede's Latin version runs as follows:

Nunc laudare debemus auctorem regni caelestis, potentiam creatoris, et consilium illius facta Patris gloriae: quomodo ille, cum sit aeternus Deus, omnium miraculorum auctor exstitit; qui primo filiis hominum caelum pro culmine tecti dehinc terram custos humani generis omnipotens creavit.
"Now we must praise the author of the heavenly realm, the might of the creator, and his purpose, the work of the father of glory: as he, who, the almighty guardian of the human race, is the eternal God, is the author of all miracles; who first created the heavens as highest roof for the children of men, then the earth."
