= Thomas Bedford =

Thomas Bedford may refer to:

- Thomas Bedford (theologian) (fl. 1650), English controversialist
- Thomas Bedford (historian) (died 1773), nonjuror and church historian
- Thomas Bedford (MP), MP for Bedford
- Thomas Bedford, physicist and namesake of Bedford Island
- Thomas Bedford, American Revolutionary War officer, namesake of Bedford County, Tennessee
- Tommy Bedford (born 1942), South African rugby player

== See also ==
- Bedford (surname)
