= Bedford Township, Michigan =

Bedford Township is the name of some places in the U.S. state of Michigan:

- Bedford Charter Township, Michigan in Calhoun County, Michigan
- Bedford Township, Monroe County, Michigan

== See also ==
- Bedford Township (disambiguation)
