= Thomas Bedford (historian) =

Nonjuror and Church historian (died 1773)

- Died: 1773

Thomas Bedford (died 1773) was a nonjuror and church historian, the second son of Hilkiah Bedford (1663–1724), the nonjuring Bishop and his wife Alice Cooper.

== Life ==
Bedford was educated at Westminster School, and proceeded to St. John's College, Cambridge, admitted as sizar (age 17) in May 1724. As a result of his nonjuring principles he did not take a degree as that required an oath of loyalty to George I. He was admitted into priests orders in the nonjuring Church of England by Bishop Henry Gandy on 27 December 1731, and became chaplain in the family of Sir John Cotton, with whom he afterwards lived at Angers. In 1736 he returned to England and his next home was in the county of Durham, where his sister was married to the nonjuring Bishop George Smith, son of Dr. John Smith, the learned editor of Bede. Here Bedford prepared an edition of Symeon of Durham's De Exordio atque Procursu Dunhelmensis Ecclesiæ libellus, from what he supposed to be an original or contemporary manuscript in the cathedral library; from the same manuscript he added "a continuation to the year 1164, and an account of the hard usage Bishop William received from Rufus", and he prefaced the work with a dissertation by Thomas Rudd. This book was published by subscription in 1732.

In late 1741 Bedford moved to Derbyshire, at Compton, near Ashbourne, to take over the local nonjuring community from the late Rev Burdyn at a stipend of £40 per annum. He would continue in this role until 1773, becoming one of the last nonjuring priests in the country. He wrote an historical catechism in 1742. The first edition was taken from the Abbé Fleury's "Catéchisme Historique", but the second was so much altered that he omitted the abbé's name from the title-page. Bedford was a friend of Ellis Farneworth, the translator, and is said to have translated for him Fleury's Short History of the Israelites, published in Farneworth's name, in order to raise a few pounds for his friend when in pecuniary distress. Bedford lived at Compton until his death in February 1773. His will left sums to relatives and other nonjurors, including £20 to be distributed amongst the children of Dr Thomas Deacon, a nonjuring Bishop in Manchester. (Note: Nichols's Anecdotes, i. 169, ii. 392, vii. 698) (Note: Gough's British Topography (under Durham)) (Note: Cole's Athenæ) (Note: British Museum Catalogue)
