= Leningrad manuscript =

Leningrad manuscript may refer to:

- Saint Petersburg Bede, formerly known as the Leningrad Bede, an Anglo-Saxon illuminated manuscript, a near-contemporary version of Bede's 8th century history Historia ecclesiastica gentis Anglorum (Ecclesiastical History of the English People)
- Leningrad Codex, the oldest complete manuscript of the Hebrew Bible in Hebrew, using the masoretic text and Tiberian vocalization
