= Farneworth =

Farneworth may refer to:

- Ellis Farneworth
- Farnworth
