= Johann Rynmann of Augsburg =

Johann Rynmann of Augsburg, also referred to as John Rynmann of Augsburg, (died 1522) is considered to be the first non-printing publisher. He started his profession as a bookseller in the German city of Oehringen and later moved to Augsburg in Bavaria. Unlike many of the publishers of his time, Rynmann would hire others to conduct the technical production of printed material, choosing instead to concentrate on the distribution and sale of work contracted to him. Reynmann published nearly 200 books but never printed one of them.

== Known Publications ==
Compendium perutile IV librorum sententiarum written by Nicolaus De Orbellus (Printed by Heinrich Gran in Haguenau, Alsace, 1503)
Hieronymus de Villa Vitis. (Printed by Heinrich Gran in Haguenau, Alsace, 1509)
History and Life of the Reverend Doctor Johannes Tauler with Twenty-Five of his Sermons (printed in Basel, Switzerland, 1521)
Rosarium sermonum predicabilium written by Bernardino de'Busti (Printed by Heinrich Gran in Haguenau, Alsace, 1500).
