= Joseph Smith (academic) =

English churchman and academic

Joseph Smith (1670–1756) was an English churchman and academic, Provost of The Queen's College, Oxford, from 1730.

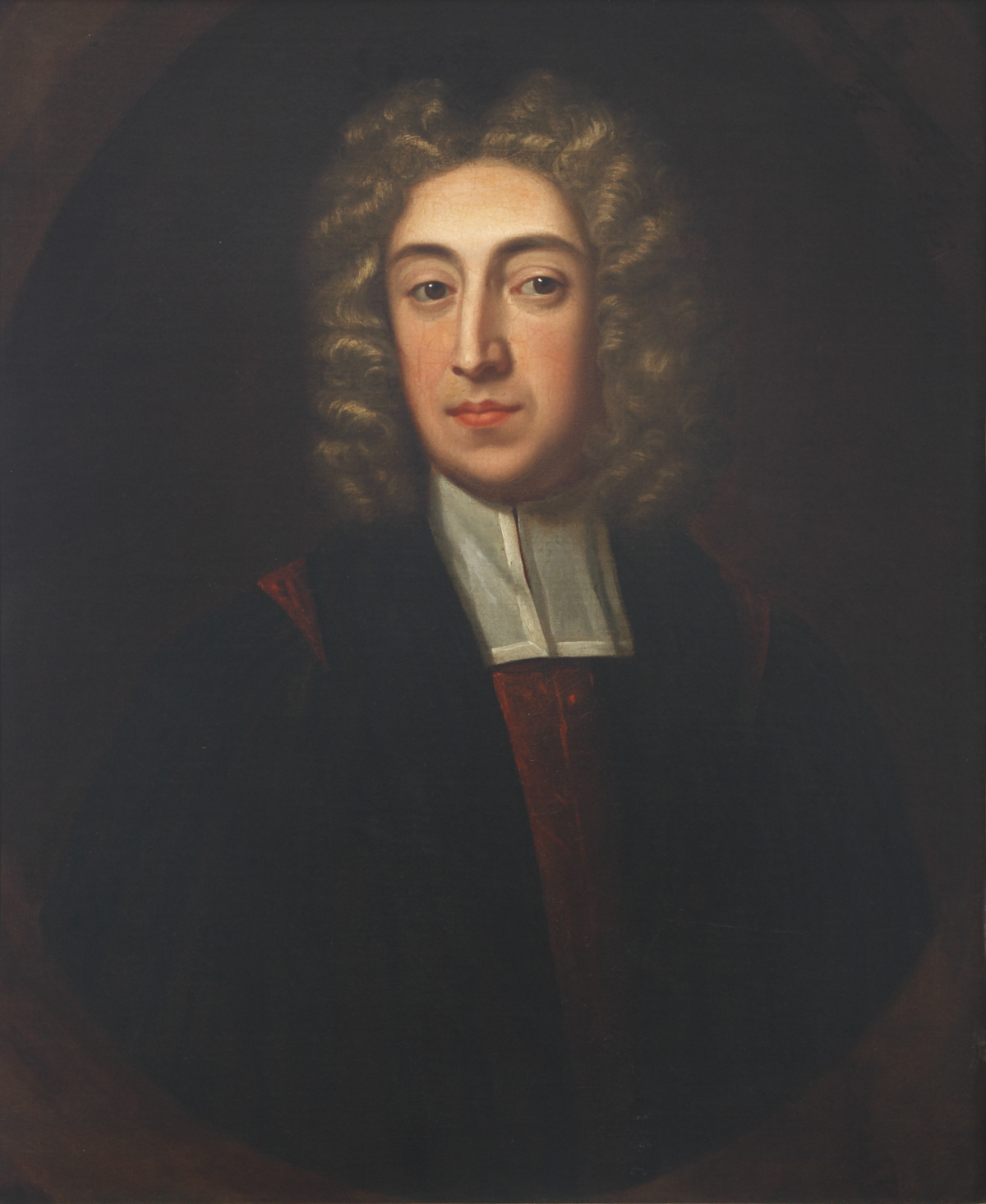
Joseph Smith, portrait by James Maubert

== Early life ==
The fifth son of William Smith, rector of Lowther, Westmorland, and younger brother of John Smith (1659–1715), he was born at Lowther, on 10 October 1670. On his father's death when he was five years old, his mother moved to Guisborough in Yorkshire, where he attended Guisborough grammar school. He went on to Durham School, and on 10 May 1689 he was admitted a scholar of The Queen's College, Oxford. In 1693 he was chosen a tabarder and graduated B.A. in 1694.

Smith proceeded M.A. by diploma in 1697, having accompanied Sir Joseph Williamson, his godfather, who was one of the British plenipotentiaries, to the negotiations for the Treaty of Ryswick as his private secretary. On 31 October 1698, in his absence, he was elected a fellow of the college. Soon after his return in 1700 he took holy orders and obtained from the Provost Timothy Halton the living of Iffley, near Oxford. In 1702 he was chosen to address Queen Anne on her visit to the university. In 1704 he was elected senior proctor, and dubbed "handsome Smith" to distinguish him from his colleague Thomas Smith of St John's College. In the same year Halton died, and friends proposed him as a candidate for Provost; but Smith backed William Lancaster, his former tutor, who was elected.

== London positions ==
The new Provost presented Smith to London posts: Russell Court Chapel and the lectureship of Trinity Chapel, Hanover Square, which he held until 1731. He became also chaplain to Edward Villiers, 1st Earl of Jersey, who introduced him to Queen Anne, gave him opportunities of preaching before her, and obtained for him the promise of the first vacant canonry in St George's Chapel. In 1708 he took the degrees of B.D. and D.D., and on 29 November was presented by the college to the rectory of Knights Enham and to the donative of Upton Grey, both in Hampshire. In 1716 he exchanged Upton Grey for the rectory of St Dionis, Lime Street, London.

On the accession of George I, Smith was again introduced to court, by the Earl of Grantham, and was made chaplain to the Princess of Wales. In 1723 Edmund Gibson, Bishop of Lincoln, an old college friend, appointed him to the prebend of Dunholm, and on Gibson's transfer to the see of London he gave him the donative of Paddington. In 1724 he was appointed to the lectureship of the new church of St George's, Hanover Square, and on 8 May 1728 Gibson gave him the prebend of St. Mary Newington in St Paul's Cathedral.

== Provost in Oxford ==
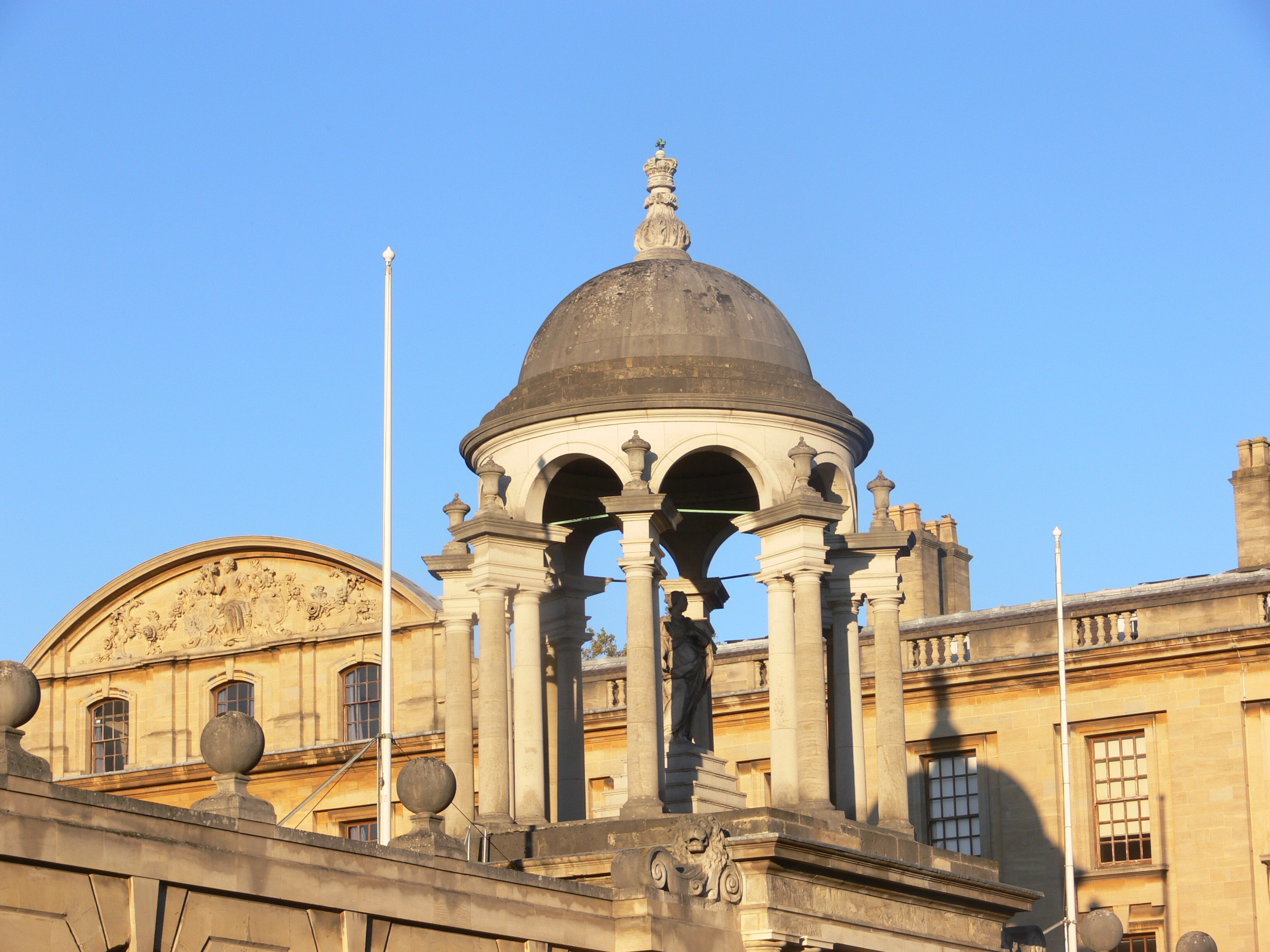
Statue of Queen Caroline by Henry Cheere, The Queen's College, Oxford

In 1730, on the death of John Gibson, Smith, without doing any canvassing, was chosen Provost of The Queen's College. He was a reforming head of house.

Through the good offices of Arthur Onslow, Speaker of the House of Commons, and of John Selwyn, Queen Caroline's treasurer, Smith obtained a benefaction of £1000 towards adorning the college; he then had the queen's statue placed over the gateway. He induced Lady Elizabeth Hastings to settle several exhibitions on the college. He obtained an order in chancery which forced Sir Orlando Bridgeman to pay over a donation from his son Francis Bridgeman. He also arranged the foundation of eight additional fellowships as well as four scholarships by John Michel of Richmond, Surrey.

Smith died in Queen's College on 23 November 1756, and was interred in the vault under the new chapel.

== Works ==
Smith was the author of:

- Modern Pleas for Schism and Infidelity Reviewed, London, 1717.
- A Modest Review of the Bishop of Bangor's Answer to Dr. Snape, London, 1717. An early pamphlet in the Bangorian controversy, and unlike others of January 1717, under a real name.
- Some Considerations offered to the Bishop of Bangor on his Preservative against the Principles of the Nonjurors, London, 1717.
- The Unreasonableness of Deism, London, 1720.
- Anarchy and Rebellion, 1720.
- A View of the Being, Nature, and Attributes of God, Oxford, 1756; besides several sermons.

To Smith has also been attributed The Difference between the Nonjurors and the Present Public Assemblies, 1716. It provoked the reply, Joseph and Benjamin; or Little Demetrius tossed in a Blanket, London, June 1717, an anonymous farce printed by John Morphew. In 1731 he drew up a statement of the architectural condition of Queens's with an ichnography, an expansion of a statement first issued in Provost Gibson's time; and ordered cuts of the buildings by Michael Burghers (died 1727) to be re-engraved in quarto.

== Family ==
In 1709 Smith married Mary Lowther, youngest daughter of Henry Lowther of Ingleton Hall in Yorkshire and of Lowther in Fermanagh, and niece of Timothy Halton. She died on 29 April 1745. By her he had three children:

- Joseph, an advocate of Doctors' Commons;
- Anne, married, first, to Prebendary Lamplugh, a grandson of the archbishop Thomas Lamplugh, and, secondly, to Captain James Hargraves; and
- William, who died young.

== Notes ==
Attribution

This article incorporates text from a publication now in the public domain: Lee, Sidney, ed. (1898). "Smith, Joseph (1670-1756)". Dictionary of National Biography. Vol. 53. London: Smith, Elder & Co.
