= Bedford Park Boulevard =

Bedford Park Boulevard may refer to:

- A thoroughfare in the Bedford Park and Jerome Park neighborhoods of the Bronx, New York, U.S.
- Stations of the New York City Subway in the Bronx:
  - Bedford Park Boulevard–Lehman College station, serving the 4 train
  - Bedford Park Boulevard station, serving the B and D trains
  - 200th Street station (formerly Bedford Park Boulevard station), on the now-demolished Third Avenue Elevated line

== See also ==
- Bedford Park (disambiguation)
