= New Bedford (disambiguation) =

New Bedford most commonly is used in reference to the major city in the U.S. state of Massachusetts.

New Bedford may also refer to:

== Places ==
- New Bedford, Illinois
- Relating to New Bedford, Massachusetts:
  - New Bedford Whaling National Historical Park
- New Bedford, New Jersey
- New Bedford, Ohio
- New Bedford, Pennsylvania

== Events ==
- 1928 New Bedford Textile Strike

== Ships ==
- USS New Bedford, more than one United States Navy ship
