= Bedford Township =

Bedford Township may refer to:

- Bedford Township, Cross County, Arkansas, in Cross County, Arkansas
- Bedford Township, Wayne County, Illinois
- Bedford Township, Taylor County, Iowa
- Bedford Township, Calhoun County, Michigan
- Bedford Township, Monroe County, Michigan
- Bedford Township, Lincoln County, Missouri
- Bedford Township, Coshocton County, Ohio
- Bedford Township, Cuyahoga County, Ohio, defunct
- Bedford Township, Meigs County, Ohio
- Bedford Township, Pennsylvania
