= Heinrich Gran =

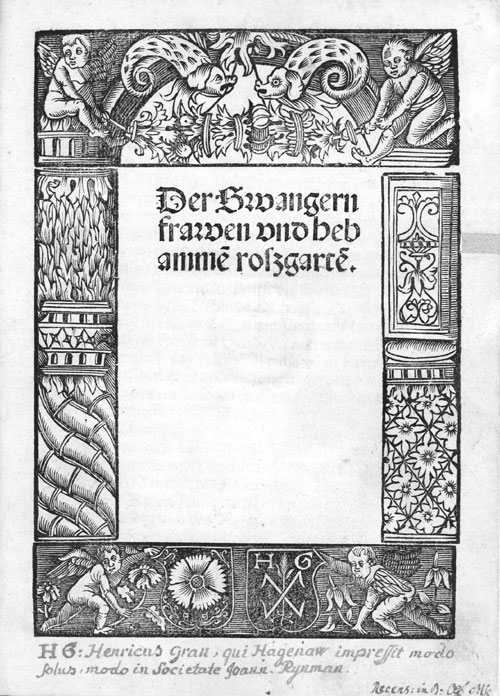
Eucharius Rösslin: Der Swangern frawen und Hebammen roszgarten, second edition printed by Heinrich Gran.

Heinrich Gran (French: Henri Gran; active 1489–1527 in Haguenau) was a German book printer of the incunabular era. Together with Johannes Mentelin and Heinrich Eggestein, he was one of the pioneers of book-printing in Alsace.

Little is known about Gran's life other than that he introduced printing to Haguenau, then a more important city than today. Between 1501 and 1527 he printed 213 works of mostly theological content. The municipal library of Haguenau owns a collection of about forty incunabula from his workshop, signed with the monogram HG, and showing sometimes the emblem of the city, the rose. He printed the Epistolæ Obscurorum Virorum, among other works. One of Gran's most important clients was the pioneering publisher Johann Rynmann of Augsburg, who financed the printing of 174 out of the 213 works issued by his press between 1501 and 1527. Many of Gran's books were destined for Hungary. Gran also seems to have worked sometimes with his junior, Haguenau printer Thomas Anshelm.
