= Hilkiah Bedford =

Hilkiah Bedford (1663–1724) was an English clergyman, a nonjuror and writer, imprisoned as the author of a book really by George Harbin.

== Life ==
He was born in Hosier Lane, near West Smithfield, London, where his father was a mathematical instrument maker. The family originally came from Sibsey, near Boston, Lincolnshire, from where Hilkiah's grandfather, a quaker, moved to London and settled there as a stationer in the seventeenth century. He was educated at Bradley, Suffolk, and in 1679 proceeded to St. John's College, Cambridge, where he was elected as the first scholar on the foundation of his maternal grandfather, William Plat. He was elected fellow of St. John's, and having received holy orders was instituted to the rectory of Wittering.

At the Glorious Revolution he refused to take the oaths to the new monarchs, and was ejected from his living. He then kept a successful boarding house at Westminster for the scholars of Westminster School. He became chaplain to Dr. Thomas Ken, the deprived bishop of Bath and Wells, and began to write. He made a translation of An Answer to Fontenelle's History of Oracles, edited Peter Barwick's Vita Joannis Barwick, and translated it with notes. He published in 1710 a Vindication of the Church of England, and also an Essay on the Thirty-nine Articles.

The book which made Hilkiah Bedford famous was one which he did not write. In 1713 a folio volume was published anonymously, entitled The Hereditary Right of the Crown of England asserted, in an answer to William Higden, who had been a nonjuror, but recanted, and defended his recantation in a work entitled A View of the English Constitution. Bedford was suspected of having written the Hereditary Right, and was found guilty of writing, printing, and publishing it. He was fined 1,000 marks and imprisoned for three years, and after the expiration of the period was to find sureties for his good behaviour during life. He was also condemned to appear before the court with a paper on his hat confessing the crime; but this part of the sentence was remitted in consideration of his being a clergyman. The real author was George Harbin, also a nonjuror; it is said that Hilkiah Bedford knew this, but preferred to suffer unjustly rather than betray Harbin. Thomas Thynne, 1st Viscount Weymouth sent Harbin to Bedford with £100, not knowing that Harbin (his chaplain) was responsible for the book. Hilkiah Bedford became a bishop among the nonjurors; he left a son Thomas Bedford.
