= Moore Bede =

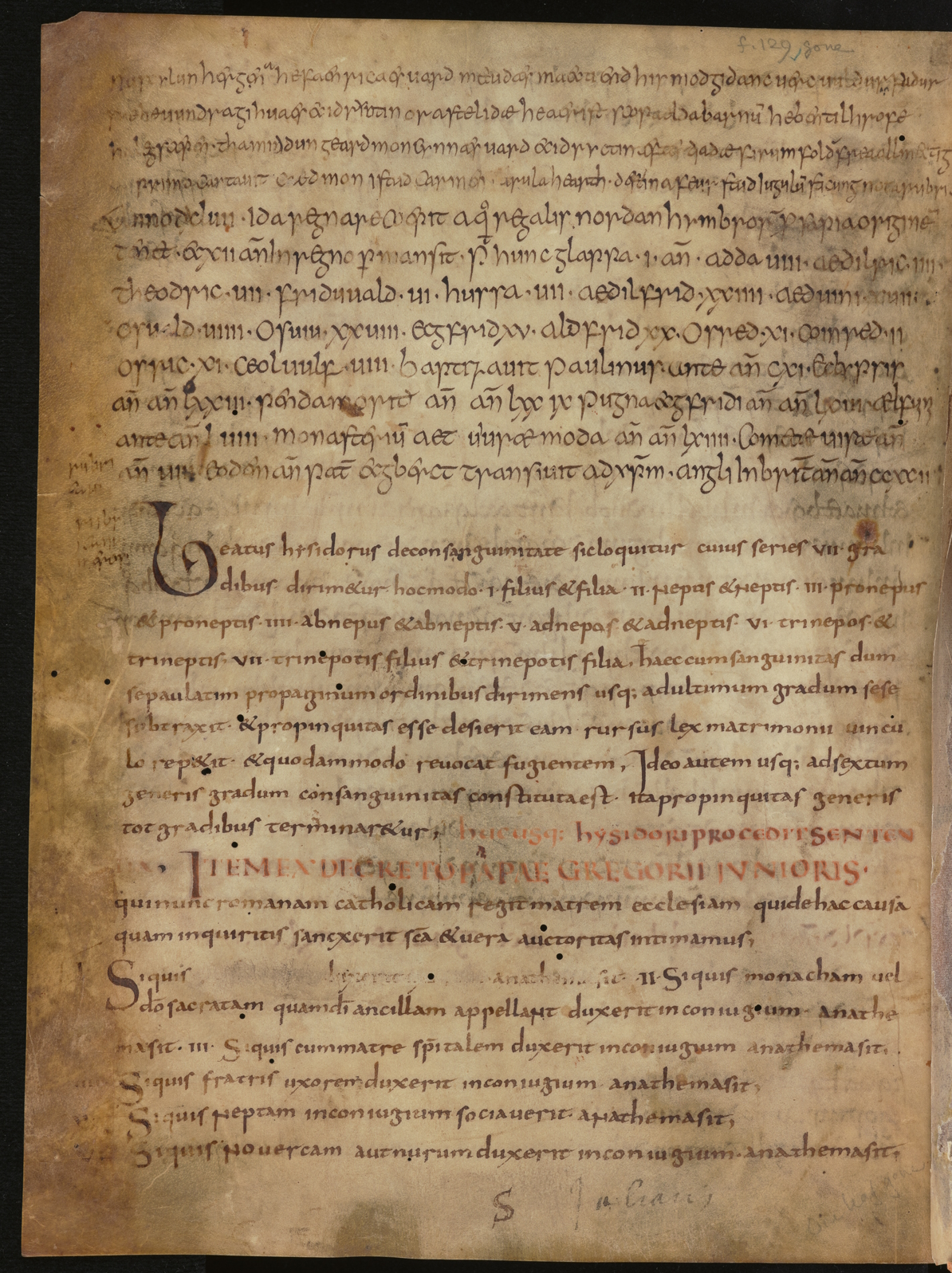
The final page of the Moore Bede. The first lines are taken up by the Old English version of Cædmon's Hymn.

The Moore Bede (Cambridge, University Library, Kk. 5. 16) is an early manuscript of Bede's 8th-century Historia ecclesiastica gentis Anglorum (Ecclesiastical History of the English People). It was formerly owned by Bishop John Moore (1646–1714), whose collection of books and manuscripts was purchased by George I and donated to Cambridge University.

== Physical description ==
The manuscript is written on parchment. It contains 128 folios. Pages average approximately 293 × 215 mm with a writing surface of 250 × 185 mm (1 column, 30–33 lines in the main text). The manuscript has been copied in a single hand and shows signs of haste.

== Contents ==
The Moore Bede contains (with the Saint Petersburg Bede) one of the two earliest representatives of the m-type text of the Latin Historia ecclesiastica gentis Anglorum.

The manuscript contains a copy of the Northumbrian aelda recension of Cædmon's Hymn on the last page of the manuscript, f. 128v. The poem is in the hand of a contemporary scribe, probably to be identified with that responsible for the so-called Memoranda on the same page (written in a larger script, but showing many similarities to the more cramped Cædmon’s Hymn and the main text of ff. 1r-128r).

== Dating ==
The Moore Bede is traditionally dated to 734–737 on the basis of the so-called Moore Memoranda, a series of chronological notes preserved on f. 128v. Although the validity of these (and similar notes in the Saint Petersburg Bede) as evidence for the manuscript’s date has been challenged vigorously, the manuscript can be dated securely to the 8th century on palaeographic and codicological grounds.

The manuscript is now thought "likely to be English in origin" (Ker 1990). Bischoff has shown that the manuscript was at the Palace School at Aachen around CE 800. Parkes suggests that it may have been sent to there from York at the request of Alcuin.

== Bibliography ==
- Blair, Peter Hunter, ed. 1959. The Moore Bede: Cambridge University Library Kk. 5. 16. With a contribution by R. A. B. Mynors. Early English Manuscripts in Facsimile, 9. Copenhagen: Rosenkilde & Bagger
- Colgrave, B. & Mynors, R. A. B., eds. 1969, Bede’s ecclesiastical history of the English people. Oxford Medieval Texts. Oxford: Clarendon Press. pp. xliii–xliv;
- Dobbie, E. v. K. 1937. The manuscripts of Cædmon’s Hymn and Bede’s Death Song with a critical text of the Epistola Cuthberti de obitu Bedæ. Columbia University Studies in English and Comparative Literature, 128. New York: Columbia University Press. pp. 11–16;
- Hardwick C., et al., eds. [1856-1867] 1980. A Catalogue of the Manuscripts Preserved in the Library of the University of Cambridge. Munich: Kraus. Reprint by G. Olms. Vol. 3: art. 2058;
- Ker, N. R. 1990. Catalogue of manuscripts containing Anglo-Saxon. Oxford: Clarendon Press. Art. 25.
- Lowe, E. A. 1934-, Codices latini antiquiores: a palaeographical guide to Latin manuscripts prior to the ninth century. Oxford: Clarendon Press. Art. 139.
- Mayor, J. E. B. & Lumby, J. R., eds. 1878. Venerabilis Bedae historiae ecclesiasticae gentis anglorum libri IV. Cambridge: Cambridge University Press; pp. 413, 431*.
- O'Donnell, D. P. 2005. Cædmon’s Hymn, a multimedia study, edition, and witness archive. SEENET A. 7. Cambridge: D. S. Brewer. §§ 4.29–4.30.
- Paleographical Society. 1879. Facsimiles of Manuscripts and Inscriptions. London: W. Clowes & Sons. Vol. 1: pll. 139 and 140 and accompanying letterpress;
- Plummer, C., ed. [1896] 1969. Venerabilis Baedae Historia ecclesiastica gentis Anglorum, Historia abbatum, Epistola ad Ecgberctum, una cum Historia abbatum auctore anonymo. Oxford: Clarendon Press. Vol. 1: lxxxix-xci;
- Robinson, P. R. 1988. Catalogue of Dated and Datable Manuscripts c. 737–1600 in Cambridge Libraries. Cambridge: D. S. Brewer. Art. 68 (1: 37 and 2: pll. 1 and 2);
- Robinson, F. C. & Stanley, E. G. 1991. Old English Verse Texts from Many Sources: a comprehensive collection. Early English Manuscripts in Facsimile, 23. Copenhagen: Rosenkilde & Bagger. [Facsimile of f. 128v on pl. 2.1].
- Wanley, H., ed. [1705] 1970. Librorum vett. septentrionalium catalogus. Linguarum veterum septentrionalium thesaurus. Menston: Scholar Press; p. 287.
