= Bedford High School =

Bedford High School may refer to:

United Kingdom

- Bedford High School, Bedfordshire, in the town of Bedford
- Bedford High School, Leigh, Greater Manchester, England

United States

- Bedford High School (Iowa)
- Bedford High School (Massachusetts)
- Bedford High School (New Hampshire)
- Bedford High School (Ohio)
- Bedford High School (Pennsylvania)
- Bedford Senior High School, in Temperance, Michigan

== See also ==
- New Bedford High School, in New Bedford, Massachusetts
- Bedford North Lawrence High School, in Bedford, Indiana
