= Bedford Park =

Bedford Park may refer to:

- Bedford Park, South Australia, a suburb of Adelaide, Australia
- Bedford Park, Toronto, a neighborhood of Toronto, Ontario, Canada
- Bedford Park, Bedford, an urban park in Bedford, UK
- Bedford Park, London, a district of Chiswick, London, UK
- Bedford Park, Illinois, U.S., a village
- Bedford Park, Bronx, a neighborhood of the Bronx, New York City, New York, U.S.
- Bedford, Western Australia, a suburb of Perth, Western Australia formerly known as Bedford Park
- Bedford Park (film), a 2026 American film

== See also ==
- Bedford Park Boulevard (disambiguation)
- Bedfords Park, a park in the London Borough of Havering
