= John Smith (priest, born 1659) =

English cleric

John Smith (1659–1715) was an English cleric, known for his edition of the Historia ecclesiastica gentis Anglorum of Bede.

== Life ==
Son of William Smith, who married in 1657 Elizabeth, daughter of Giles Wetherall of Stockton, he was born at Lowther, Westmorland on 10 November 1659, one of 11 brothers, who included Joseph Smith and others well known in their time. He was educated by his father at Bradford, Yorkshire, under Christopher Ness, and then at Appleby grammar school.

Smith was admitted to St John's College, Cambridge on 12 June 1674 as a sizar, graduating B.A. 1677, and M.A. 1681. On leaving he was ordained deacon and priest of the Church of England by Archbishop Richard Sterne; in July 1682 he was admitted a minor canon of Durham Cathedral, was shortly afterwards collated to the curacy of Croxdale, and on 1 July 1684 to that of Witton Gilbert. From 1686 to 1689 he acted as chaplain to Lord Lansdown, the English ambassador at Madrid. In 1694 he was appointed domestic chaplain to Nathaniel Crew, who in the following year collated him to the rectory and hospital of Gateshead, and on 25 September 1695 to the seventh prebendal stall in Durham Cathedral.

In 1696 Smith was created D.D. at Cambridge, and three years later was made treasurer of Durham, to which the bishop added in July 1704 the rectory of Bishop-Wearmouth. Here he rebuilt the rectory and restored the chancel of the church, but In 1713 his health began to fail, and he died at Cambridge on 30 July 1715. He was buried in the chapel of St John's College, where a monument was erected, with an inscription by his friend Thomas Baker.

== Works ==
Smith undertook his major work, an edition of Bede's Historia, under the influence of Thomas Gale, encouraged by Ralph Thoresby, and with assistance of Humfrey Wanley on Old English. He spent the majority of his time residing in Cambridge, and working on it, but did not live to complete the preparation. His son George brought out in 1722 the Historiæ Ecclesiasticæ Gentis Anglorum Libri Quinque, auctore Venerabili Bæda … cura et studio Johannis Smith, S. T. P., Cambridge University Press.

This edition is described by David C. Douglas as "an enormous advance" on previous ones, adding that textual criticism of Bede hardly then changed until 1896, when the Charles Plummer edition appeared. He also calls Smith one of "the founders of English medieval scholarship". It contains also the preface to The Reckoning of Time, and a world-chronicle. It also had the Old English version of the Historia ecclesiastica.

Smith also furnished materials for Edmund Gibson's edition of William Camden, and to James Anderson for his Historical Essay in 1705.

== Family ==
Smith married in 1692 Mary, eldest daughter of William Cooper of Scarborough, who gave his daughter a portion of £4,500; they had, with four other sons, George Smith the nonjuror.

== Notes ==
Attribution

This article incorporates text from a publication now in the public domain: Lee, Sidney, ed. (1898). "Smith, John (1659-1715)". Dictionary of National Biography. Vol. 53. London: Smith, Elder & Co.
