= HMS Bedford =

Three ships of the Royal Navy have borne the name HMS Bedford, named initially after William Russell, created Duke of Bedford in May 1694 and not after the town of Bedford:

- HMS Bedford (1698) was a 70-gun third rate launched in 1698. She was rebuilt in 1741 to carry 64-guns, was hulked in 1767 and sold in 1787.
- HMS Bedford (1775) was a 74-gun third rate launched in 1775. She was used as a prison ship from 1801 and was broken up in 1817.
- HMS Bedford (1901) was a Monmouth-class armoured cruiser launched in 1901. She was wrecked in 1910 and the wreck was sold later that year.

== See also ==
- HMS Bedford Galley was a 34-gun fifth rate launched in 1697, and purchased that year for Navy service. She was rebuilt in 1709 and converted into a fire ship in 1716. She was sunk as a foundation at Sheerness in 1725.
