= Bedford Township, Lincoln County, Missouri =

Township in Missouri, US

Coordinates: 39.00299°N 91.006996°W

Bedford Township is an inactive township in Lincoln County, in the U.S. state of Missouri.
