= Ellis Farneworth =

English translator

Ellis Farneworth (died 1763), was an English translator.

== Life ==
Farneworth was born probably at Bonsall or Bonteshall, Derbyshire, of which place his father, Ellis Farneworth, was rector. He was taught first at Chesterfield School under William Burrow, and afterwards at Eton. He matriculated at Jesus College, Cambridge on 17 December 1730 and graduated B.A. in 1734 and M.A. in 1738. In 1755 he was acting as curate to John Fitzherbert, vicar of Ashbourne, Derbyshire; but on 27 Dec. 1758 he became vicar of Rostherne, Cheshire, by the influence of William Fitzherbert of Tissington, Derbyshire, brother of his former vicar (Ormerod, Cheshire, i. 343). In October 1762 he was instituted to the rectory of Carsington, Derbyshire, at the insistence of his friend, the Hon. James Yorke, dean of Lincoln. There he died 25 March 1763.

== Works ==
Farneworth published the following translations:

- The Life of Pope Sixtus the Fifth … in which is included the state of England, France, Spain, Italy, &c., at that time … translated from the Italian of Gregorio Leti, with a preface, prolegomena, notes, and appendix, fol., London, 1754; another edition, 8vo, Dublin, 1779.
- The History of the Civil Wars of France … a new translation from the Italian of Davila (anecdotes relating to the Author, chiefly from the Italian of A. Zeno), 2 vols. 4to, London, 1758.
- The Works of Nicholas Machiavel … newly translated from the originals; illustrated with notes, anecdotes, dissertations, and the life of Machiavel … and several new plans on the art of war, 2 vols. 4to, London, 1762; 2nd edit., corrected, 4 vols. 8vo, London, 1775.

To Farneworth was also attributed A Short History of the Israelites; with an account of their Manners, Customs, Laws, Polity, and Religion. … Translated from the French of Abbé Fleury, 8vo, London, 1756; but it was only by the kindness of Thomas Bedford, second son of Hilkiah Bedford, who gave him the translation, in hopes that he might be enabled to raise a few pounds by it, as he was then very poor and the only support of his two sisters. None indeed of his works appear to have been profitable, although his translation of Machiavelli, which he literally 'hawked round the town,’ was afterwards in request. On one occasion John Addenbrooke, Dean of Lichfield, strongly recommended him to translate John Spelman's Life of Alfred the Great from the Latin into English, and Farneworth was about to begin when Samuel Pegge luckily heard of it, and sent him word that the Life of Alfred was originally written in English and thence translated into Latin. Under the pseudonym of Philopyrphagus Ashburniensis Farneworth contributed a humorous account of Robert Powell, the fire-eater, to the Gentleman's Magazine for February 1755 (xxv. 59–61).
