= Saint Petersburg Bede =

Manuscript of Bede's Ecclesiastical History

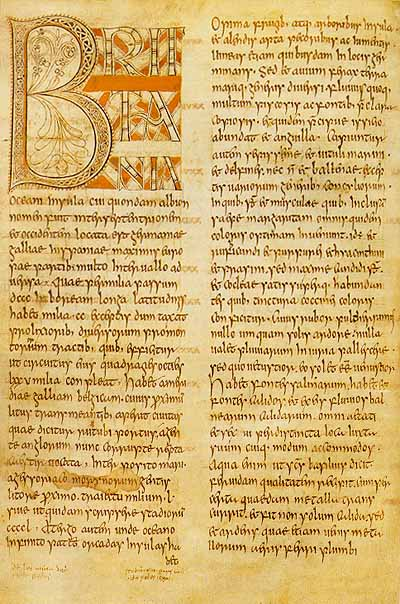
Folio 3v from the Saint Petersburg Bede

The Saint Petersburg Bede (Saint Petersburg, National Library of Russia, lat. Q. v. I. 18), formerly known as the Leningrad Bede, is an Anglo-Saxon illuminated manuscript, a near-contemporary version of Bede's 8th century history, the Historia ecclesiastica gentis Anglorum (Ecclesiastical History of the English People). Although not heavily illuminated, it is famous for containing the earliest historiated initial (one containing a picture) in European illumination. It is so named because it was taken to the Russian National Library of Saint Petersburg in Russia at the time of the French Revolution, by Peter P. Dubrovsky.

== Dating ==
Traditionally, the Saint Petersburg Bede is attributed on palaeographic grounds to Bede's monastery at Wearmouth-Jarrow. It is also traditionally dated to 731/732 × 746 on the basis of the so-called Memoranda, a series of retrospective dates found in the margins of Bede's recapitulo in Book V Chapter 24. The validity of these Memoranda (and similar notes in the Moore Bede) as evidence for the precise year in which the manuscript was copied has been vigorously challenged. While it may not be possible to assign the manuscript to a specific year, it seems unlikely that it was copied much after the middle of the eighth century.

== Physical description ==
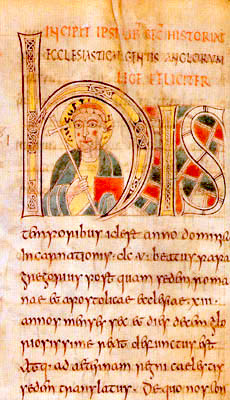
The Saint Petersburg Bede contains the oldest historiated initial known, from the 8th century (shown above)

The manuscript is written on parchment. It contains 162 folios (numbered 161, but with f. 51 repeated—the correct foliation is given on the last folio in the bottom right corner). Pages average approximately 270 × 190 mm (Writing Space: 230 × 150 mm in two columns of 27 lines). The pages have been trimmed at some point. The manuscript has been copied by four hands, with textual "accessories" (colophons, chapter numbers, and the like) in a fifth (Parkes 1982, 6-11).

The opening three letters of Book 2 of Bede are decorated, to a height of 8 lines of the text, and the opening h contains a bust portrait of a haloed figure carrying a cross and a book. This may be intended to be St. Gregory the Great, although a much later hand has identified the figure as St. Augustine of Canterbury in the halo. The figure is identified as a saint, rather than Christ, by his clerical tonsure. Although the letter decoration is essentially Insular in style, the figure shows Mediterranean influence, as do other elements of the illuminations, such as the foliate decoration filling in the B shown above.

== Contents ==
The Saint Petersburg Bede contains one of the two oldest surviving examples of the "m-type" text of the Latin Historia ecclesiastica (Colgrave and Mynors 1969, xliv). The manuscript also contains one of two copies of the vernacular text of the Northumbrian aelda recension of Cædmon's Hymn in the bottom margin of "f. 107r" (actually f. 108r; see Cædmon's Hymn). The poem has been copied in the fourth hand of the main Latin text (Parkes 1982, 6).

== Bibliography ==
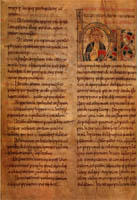
The oldest historiated initial known, full page view

The Saint Petersburg Bede is a frequently studied manuscript. The following is a partial bibliography of significant studies and catalogue entries:

Re Illuminations:

- Meyer Schapiro, The Decoration of the Leningrad Manuscript of Bede, in Selected Papers, volume 3, Late Antique, Early Christian and Mediaeval Art, 1980, Chatto & Windus, London, ISBN 0-7011-2514-4 (originally Scriptorium, xii, 2, (1958), also JSTOR etc.).
- T. Voronova and A Sterligov, Western European Illuminated Manuscripts (in the St Petersberg Public Library), 2003, p198, Sirocco, London.

Re Texts:

- Anderson, O. S. 1941. Old English material in the Leningrad manuscript of Bede's ecclesiastical history. Skrifter utgivna av Kungl. humanistiska vetenskapssamfundet i Lund/Acta reg. societatis humaniorum litterarum Lundensis, 31. Lund: Gleerup.
- Arngart, O. S. 1952. The Leningrad Bede: an eighth century manuscript of the Venerable Bede's Historia ecclesiastica gentis Anglorum in the Public Library, Leningrad. Early English Manuscripts in Facsimile, 2. Copenhagen: Rosenkilde & Bagger.
- ————. 1973. "On the dating of early Bede manuscripts". Studia Nordica 45: 47-52.
- Bévenot, M. S. J. 1962. "Towards dating the Leningrad 'Bede'." Scriptorium 36: 366-9.
- Colgrave, B. and R. A. B. Mynors 1969, Bede's ecclesiastical history of the English people. Oxford Medieval Texts. Oxford: Clarendon Press. p. xliv.
- Dobbie, E. v. K. 1937. The manuscripts of Cædmon's Hymn and Bede's Death Song with a critical text of the Epistola Cuthberti de obitu Bedæ. Columbia University Studies in English and Comparative Literature, 128. New York: Columbia University Press. pp. 16–17.
- Dobiache-Rojdestvensky, O. 1928. "Un manuscrit de Bède à Léningrad". Speculum 3: 314-21.
- Gillert, K. 1880. "Lateinische Handschriften in Saint Petersburg". Neues Archiv der Gesellschaft für ältere deutsche Geschichtskunde 5: 243-625 [correctly 243-265]
- Ker 1990. Catalogue of manuscripts containing Anglo-Saxon. Oxford: Clarendon Press. Art. 122.
- Lowe 1934-, Codices latini antiquiores: a palaeographical guide to Latin manuscripts prior to the ninth century. Oxford: Clarendon Press. Art. 1621.
- ————. 1958a. "A key to Bede's scriptorium: Some observations on the Leningrad Bede". Scriptorium 12: 182-90.
- ────. 1958b. "An autograph of the Venerable Bede?" Revue Bénédictine 68: 200-2.
- Meyvaert, P. 1961. "The Bede 'signature' in the Leningrad colophon". Revue Bénédictine 71: 274-86.
- O'Donnell, D. P. 2005. Cædmon's Hymn, A multimedia study, edition, and witness archive. SEENET A. 7. Cambridge: D.S. Brewer. §§ 4.37-4.38.
- ────. 2002. "The accuracy of the Saint Petersburg Bede." Notes and Queries 247: 4-6.
- Parkes, M. B. 1982. The scriptorium of Wearmouth-Jarrow. Jarrow Lectures. Jarrow: [St. Paul's Rectory]. 5-12.
- Robinson, F. C. and E. G. Stanley 1991. Old English verse texts from many sources: a comprehensive collection. Early English Manuscripts in Facsimile, 23. Copenhagen: Rosenkilde & Bagger. [Facsimile of "f. 107r" on pl. 2.3].
- Staerk, A. 1910, Les manuscrits latins du Ve au XIIIe siècle conservés à la bibliothèque impériale de Saint-Pétersbourg, I. Petrograd: Publichnia Biblioteka. Art. 26. Art. xlii
- Wright, D. H. 1961. "The date of the Leningrad Bede". Revue Bénédictine 71: 265-73.
