= Battely =

Battely is a surname. Notable people with the surname include:

- John Battely (1646–1708), English antiquarian and clergyman
- Nicholas Battely (1648–1704), English antiquarian and clergyman, brother of John
