= John Battely =

English antiquary and clergyman

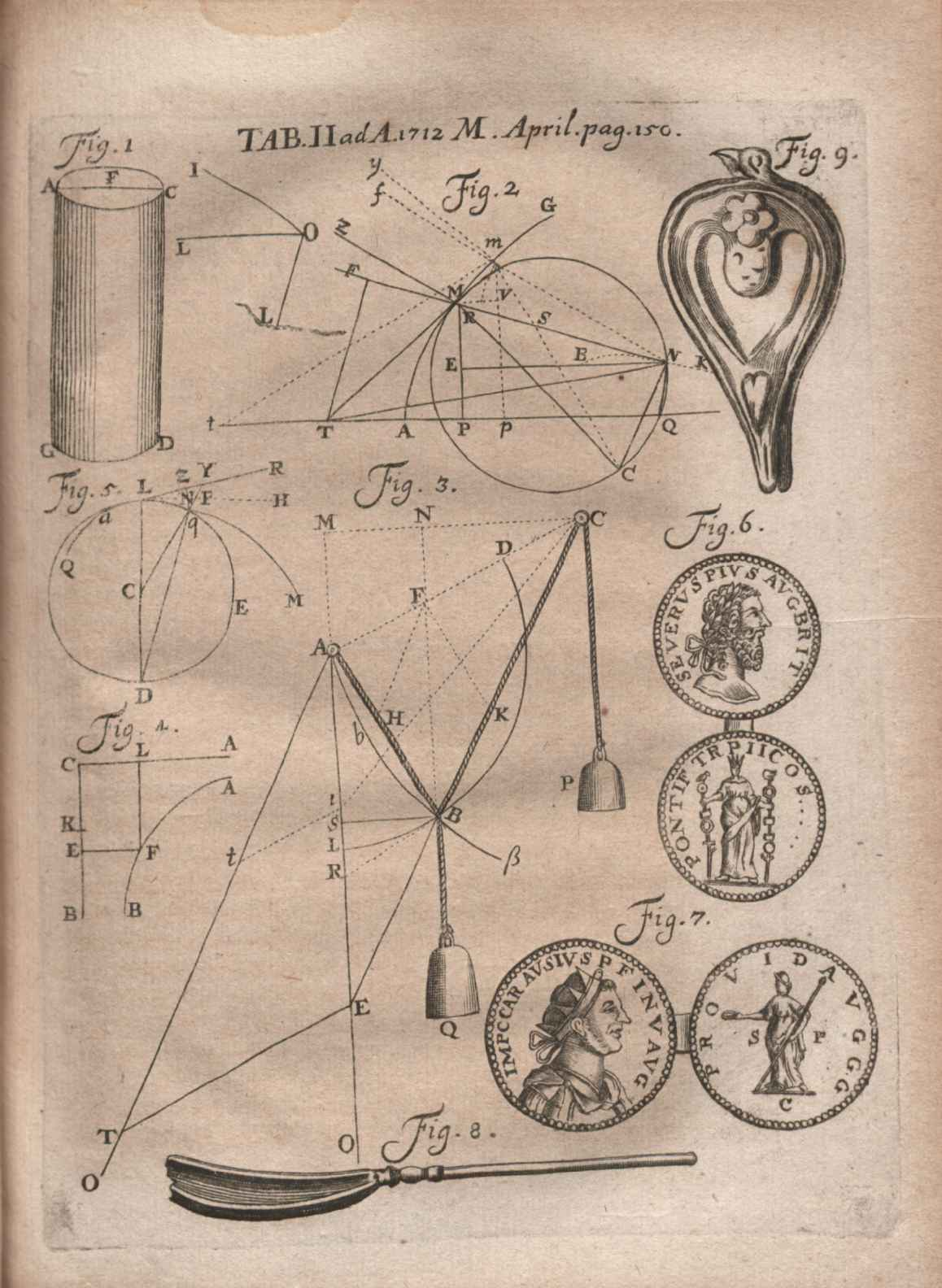
Fig. 6-9: illustration from critique of Antiquitates Rutupinae, published in Acta Eruditorum, 1712

John Battely (also spelt 'Batteley'; 1646–1708) was an English antiquary and clergyman, Archdeacon of Canterbury 1688–1708. He was the author of two antiquarian works published after his death: Antiquitates Rutupinae ('Antiquities of Richborough') and Antiquitates S. Edmundi Burgi ad Annum MCCLXXII Perductae ('Antiquities of St. Edmundsbury to 1272'). John Battely was the brother of Nicholas Battely, who edited William Somner's Cantuaria sacra, the first account of the antiquities of Canterbury.

John Battely was born on 11 November 1646 in the Parish of St. James, Bury St. Edmunds. His father, Nicholas Battely, was an apothecary. After his education at the King Edward VI Grammar School, Bury St. Edmunds, he was admitted to Trinity College, Cambridge in 1662 (B.A. 1665–6; Fellow, 1668; M.A. 1669; D.D. 1684). He was ordained at Ely in 1675 and became domestic chaplain to Archbishop Sancroft and subsequently to Archbishop Tillotson.

Battely was Rector of Hunton in Norfolk 1682–1684, and on 19 November 1684 he became Rector of Adisham in Kent. It was probably at this time that Battely began his research at Richborough Castle. In 1687, however, Battely returned to East Anglia. He was made Archdeacon of Suffolk, which entitled him to a stall at Norwich Cathedral and gave him nominal pastoral oversight of his native county. He was installed as Archdeacon of Canterbury on 24 March 1688 and became Master of the Eastbridge Hospital in the same year. On 5 November 1688 (the same day William of Orange landed at Torbay), he became a canon of Canterbury Cathedral (Stall I), and on 10 November he subscribed to the Articles of Religion. John Battely died on 10 October 1708 and his papers were inherited by his nephew Oliver Battely. In 1711 Oliver published the work on Richborough, before co-operating with Sir James Burrough to print the work on Bury St. Edmunds in 1745.

== Sources ==
- John Battely (ed. Oliver Battely), Antiquitates Rutupinae (Oxford, 1745)
- John Battely (ed. Oliver Battely), Antiquitates S. Edmundi Burgi ad Annum MCCXXII Perductae (Oxford, 1745)
