= James Fellowes =

James Fellowes may refer to:

- James Fellowes (artist), 18th-century portrait painter
- James Fellowes (cricketer) (1841–1916), English engineer and amateur cricketer
- James Fellowes (lord lieutenant) (1849–1935), English lord lieutenant
- Sir James Fellowes (physician) (1771–1857), English physician
