= White Kennett =

English bishop and antiquarian (1660–1728)

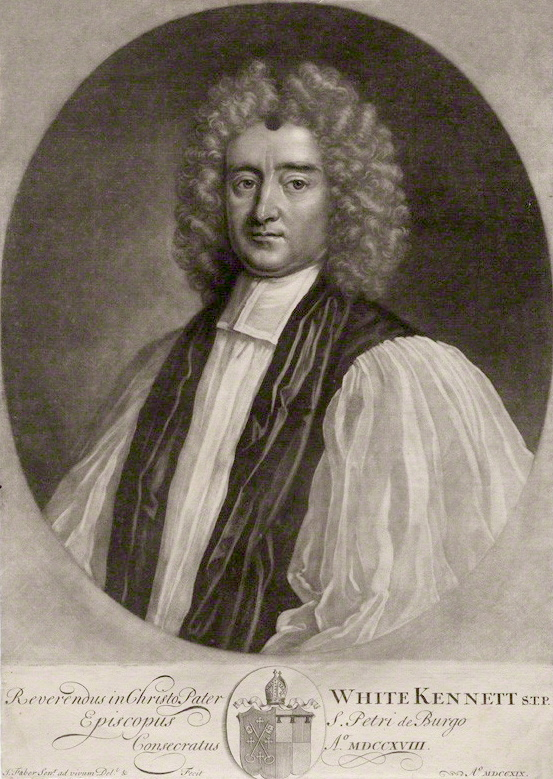
Bishop Kennett.

White Kennett (10 August 1660 – 19 December 1728) was an English bishop and antiquarian. He was educated at Westminster School and at St Edmund Hall, Oxford, where, while an undergraduate, he published several translations of Latin works, including Erasmus' In Praise of Folly.

Kennett was vicar of Ambrosden, Oxfordshire from 1685 until 1708. During his incumbency he returned to Oxford as tutor and vice-principal of St Edmund Hall, where he gave considerable impetus to the study of antiquities. George Hickes gave him lessons in Old English. In 1695 he published Parochial Antiquities. In 1700 he became rector of St Botolph's Aldgate, London, and in 1701 Archdeacon of Huntingdon.

For a eulogistic sermon on the recently deceased William Cavendish, 1st Duke of Devonshire, Kennett was in 1707 recommended to the deanery of Peterborough. He afterwards joined the Low Church party, strenuously opposed the Sacheverell movement, and in the Bangorian controversy supported with great zeal and considerable bitterness the side of Bishop Hoadly. His intimacy with Charles Trimnell, bishop of Norwich, who was high in favour with George I of Great Britain, secured for him in 1718 the bishopric of Peterborough. He died at Westminster in December 1728. White Kennett Street, near St Botolph, Aldgate, is named after him.

== Biography ==
White Kennett was born in the parish of St Mary, Dover, on 10 August 1660, the son of Basil Kennett, M.A., rector of Dymchurch and vicar of Postling, Kent, by his wife Mary, eldest daughter of Thomas White, a wealthy magistrate and master-shipwright of Dover. After receiving a preliminary education at Elham and Wye College, he was placed at Westminster School "above the curtain", or in the upper school; but as he was suffering from smallpox at the period of the election of scholars on the foundation, his father recalled him home. After his recovery he spent a year at Bekesbourne, in the family of Mr Tolson, whose three sons he taught "with great content and success". He was the older brother of Basil Kennett, whose life and career he was considerably to influence.

He was entered a batteler or semi-commoner of St Edmund Hall, Oxford, in June 1678, being placed under the tuition of Andrew Allam. According to Hearne he "sometimes waited on Dr Wallis to church with his skarlett", and performed other menial offices, but, on the other hand, he associated with the gentlemen-commoners. While an undergraduate he began his career as a writer by publishing anonymously, just before the assembling of parliament at Oxford on 21 March 1680–1, A Letter from a Student at Oxford to a Friend in the Country, concerning the approaching Parliament, in vindication of his Majesty, the Church of England, and the University. The Whig party endeavoured to discover the author, with a view to his punishment, but the sudden dissolution of the parliament put an end to the incident and occasioned the publication of Kennett's second piece, A Poem to Mr. E. L. on his Majesty's dissolving the late Parliament at Oxford, 28 March 1681.

About this period Kennett was introduced to Anthony Wood, who employed him in collecting epitaphs and notices of eminent Oxford men. In his diary, 2 March 1681–2, Wood notes that he had directed five shillings to be given to Kennett "for pains he hath taken for me in Kent". On 2 May 1682 Kennett graduated BA, and next year published a version of Erasmus's The Praise of Folly (Moriæ Encomium), under the title of Wit against Wisdom: or a Panegyric upon Folly, 1683, 8vo. In the following year he contributed the life of Chabrias to the edition of Cornelius Nepos, "done into English by several hands". He commenced MA on 22 January 1684, and having taken holy orders he became curate and assistant to Samuel Blackwell, B.D., vicar and schoolmaster of Bicester, Oxfordshire. Sir William Glynne presented him in September 1685 to the neighbouring vicarage of Ambrosden. Soon afterwards he published An Address of Thanks to a good Prince; presented in the Panegyric of Pliny upon Trajan, the best of Roman Emperors, London, 1686, 8vo, with a high-flown preface expressing his loyalty to the throne.

=== Political views ===
Kennett's political views were quickly modified by dislike of the ecclesiastical policy of James II. He preached a series of discourses against "popery", refused to read the Declaration of Indulgence in 1688, and acted with the majority of the clergy in the diocese of Oxford when they rejected an address to the king recommended by Bishop Parker. Hearne relates that at the beginning of the Glorious Revolution Kennett lent Dodwell a manuscript treatise, composed by himself and never printed, offering arguments for taking the oaths of allegiance and supremacy to William and Mary. Subsequently, Kennett openly supported the cause of the revolution, and thereby exposed himself to much obloquy from his former friends, who called him "Weathercock Kennett". In January 1689, while shooting at Middleton Stoney, his gun burst and fractured his skull. The operation of trepanning was successfully performed, but he was obliged to wear a large black patch of velvet on his forehead during the remainder of his life.

After a few years' absence at Ambrosden he returned to Oxford as tutor and vice-principal of St Edmund Hall, and in September 1691 was chosen lecturer of St Martin's, commonly called Carfax, Oxford. He was also appointed a public lecturer in the schools, and filled the office of pro-proctor for two successive years. He proceeded BD on 5 May 1694. In February 1694–5 he was presented by William Cherry to the rectory of Shottesbrooke, Berkshire. He was created DD at Oxford on 19 July 1700, and in the same year was presented to the rectory of St Botolph's Aldgate. He resigned the vicarage of Ambrosden, and did not obtain possession of St Botolph's without a lawsuit. On 15 February 1701 he was installed in the prebend of Combe and Harnham, in the church of Salisbury.

=== Antiquarian reputation ===
Kennett's historical and antiquarian researches had meanwhile procured him some reputation. From Dr George Hickes (afterwards nonjuring bishop of Thetford), who lived for a time in seclusion with him at Ambrosden, he received instruction in the Anglo-Saxon and other northern tongues. For several years the two scholars were on the most friendly terms, but eventually there was an open rupture between them, owing to religious and political differences. Kennett contributed a life of William Somner to the James Brome's edition of that antiquary's Treatise of the Roman Ports and Forts in Kent (1693), and the biography was enlarged and reissued in Somner's Treatise of Gavelkind, 2nd edition 1726. His reputation as a topographer and philologist was enhanced by his Parochial Antiquities attempted in the History of Ambrosden, Burcester, and other adjacent parts in the counties of Oxford and Bucks, with a Glossary of Obsolete Terms, Oxford, 1695, 4to, dedicated to his patron, Sir W. Glynne. A new edition, greatly enlarged from the author's manuscript notes, was issued at Oxford (2 volumes 1818, 4to) under the editorship of Bulkeley Bandinel. While engaged on this work the question of lay impropriations had come much under his notice, and he published "for the terror of evil-doers" the History and Fate of Sacrilege, discovered by examples of Scripture, of Heathens, of Christians, London, 1698, 8vo, written by Sir Henry Spelman in 1632, but omitted from the edition of that author's Posthumous Works.

=== Chaplain to Bishop Gardiner ===
Kennett was now chaplain to Bishop Gardiner of Lincoln, and on 15 May 1701 became archdeacon of Huntingdon. Thereupon he entered into a controversy with Francis Atterbury about the rights of Convocation, and ably supported Dr Wake and Edmund Gibson in their contention that convocation had few inherent rights of independent action. In Warburton's view, Kennett's arguments were based on precedents, while Atterbury's rested on principles. On Archbishop Tenison's recommendation he was appointed in 1701 one of the original members of the Society for the Propagation of the Gospel in Foreign Parts. In a sermon preached in his parish church of Aldgate on 31 January 1703–4, the fast day for the martyrdom of Charles I, Kennett acknowledged that there had been some errors in his reign, owing to a 'popish' queen and a corrupt ministry, whose policy tended in the direction of an absolute tyranny. To correct exaggerated statements made about this sermon, Kennett printed it under the title of A Compassionate Enquiry into the Causes of the Civil War, London (three editions), 1704, 4to. It elicited many angry replies from his high-church opponents.

In 1704 he published The Case of Impropriations, and of the Augmentation of Vicarages, and other insufficient Cures, stated by History and Law, from the first Usurpations of the Popes and Monks, to her Majesty's Royal Bounty lately extended to the poorer Clergy of the Church of England. A copy of this work, bound in two vols., with copious additions by the author, was formerly in the possession of Richard Gough, and is now in the Bodleian Library. In 1705 some booksellers undertook a collection of the best works on English history down to the reign of Charles II, and induced Kennett to write a continuation to the time of Queen Anne. Although it appeared anonymously as the third volume of the Compleat History of England, 1706, fol., the author's name soon became known, and he was exposed to renewed attacks from his Jacobite enemies. A new edition, with corrections, was published in 1719, but it was not until 1740 that there appeared Roger North's Examen, or an Inquiry into the Credit and Veracity of a pretended Complete History, viz. Dr. White Kennett's "History of England". His popularity at court was increased by the published denunciations of his views, and he was appointed chaplain in ordinary to her majesty. He was installed in the deanery of Peterborough 21 February 1707–8. A few days previously he had been collated to the prebend of Marston St Laurence, in the church of Lincoln.

A sermon which he preached at the funeral of the first Duke of Devonshire on 5 September 1707, and which laid him open to the charge of encouraging a deathbed repentance, was published by Henry Hills, without a dedication, in 1707. To a second edition, published by John Churchill in 1708, with a dedication to William, second duke of Devonshire, was appended Memoirs of the Family of Cavendish, a separate edition of which was published by Hills in the same year. A new edition of the sermon, with the author's manuscript corrections, was published by John Nichols in 1797, but very few copies were sold, and the remainder were destroyed by fire. The imputation against Kennett was fresh in the memory of Alexander Pope when in the Essay on Criticism he wrote:

Then unbelieving priests reformed the nation,
And taught more pleasing methods of salvation.

Kennett's subsequent preferment was naturally connected by his enemies with the strain of adulatory reference to the second duke with which the sermon concludes.

=== St Mary Aldermary, London ===
In 1707, desiring more leisure for study, he resigned the rectory of St Botolph, Aldgate, and obtained the less remunerative rectory of St Mary Aldermary, London. During this period he published numerous sermons, and his pen was actively engaged in support of his party. He zealously opposed the doctrine of the invalidity of lay baptism, and his answer to Henry Sacheverell's sermon preached before the lord mayor on 5 November 1709 raised a storm of indignation. In 1710 he was severely censured for not joining in the congratulatory address of the London clergy to the queen, which was drawn up on the accession of the tories to office after Sacheverell's trial. Kennett and others who declined to subscribe it were represented as enemies to the crown and ministry.

Richard Welton, rector of St Mary Matfelon, Whitechapel, introduced into an altar-piece in his church a portrait of Kennett to represent Judas Iscariot. It was stated that the rector had caused Kennett's figure to be substituted for that of Gilbert Burnet at the suggestion of the painter, who feared an action of scandalum magnatum if Burnet were introduced. A print of the picture in the library of the Society of Antiquaries is accompanied with these manuscript lines by Michel Maittaire:

To say the picture does to him belong,
Kennett does Judas and the Painter wrong.
False is the image, the resemblance faint:
Judas compared to Kennett is a Saint.

Multitudes of people visited the church daily to see the painting, but Henry Compton, bishop of London, soon ordered its removal. For many years afterwards it is said to have ornamented the high altar at St Albans Cathedral.

=== Society for the Propagation of the Gospel ===
To advance the interests of the Society for the Propagation of the Gospel in Foreign Parts, Kennett made a collection of books, charts, maps, and documents, with the intention of composing a History of the Propagation of Christianity in the English-American Colonies, and on the relinquishment of that project he presented his collections to the corporation, and printed a catalogue entitled Bibliothecæ Americanæ Primordia, London, 1713, 4to, afterwards republished with additions by Henry Homer the elder, 1789, 4to. He also founded an antiquarian and historical library at Peterborough, and enriched the library of that church with some scarce books, including an abstract of the manuscript collections made by Dr John Cosens, bishop of that see, and a copiously annotated copy of Gunton's History of Peterborough. The collection, consisting of about fifteen hundred books and tracts, was placed in a private room at Peterborough, and a manuscript catalogue was drawn up and subscribed Index librorum aliquot vetustorum quos in commune bonum congessit W. K., Decan. Petriburg. MDCCXII.

=== Bishop of Peterborough ===
On 25 July 1713 Kennett was installed prebendary of Farrendon-cum-Balderton at Lincoln. He preached vehemently against the Jacobite rising of 1715, and in the two following years warmly advocated the repeal of the acts against occasional conformity. In the Bangorian controversy he opposed the proceedings of convocation against Bishop Hoadly. By the influence of his friend Dr Charles Trimnell, bishop of Norwich and afterwards of Winchester, he was appointed bishop of Peterborough; he was consecrated at Lambeth on 9 November 1718, and had permission to hold the archdeaconry of Huntingdon and a prebend in Salisbury in commendam. He died ten years later at his house in St James's Street Westminster, on 19 December 1728. He was buried in Peterborough Cathedral, where a marble monument with a brief Latin inscription was erected to his memory.

=== Family ===
He married first, on 6 June 1693, Sarah, only daughter of Robert and Mary Carver of Bicester (she died on 2 March 1693–4, sine prole); secondly, on 6 June 1695, Sarah, sister of Richard Smith, M.D., of London and Aylesbury (she died in August 1702); thirdly, in 1703, Dorcas, daughter of Thomas Fuller, D.D., rector of Wellinghale, Essex, and widow of Clopton Havers, M.D. (she died 9 July 1743). His second wife bore him a son, White Kennett, rector of Burton-le-Coggles, Lincolnshire, and prebendary of Peterborough, Lincoln, and London, who died on 6 May 1740; and a daughter Sarah, who married John Newman of Shottesbrook, Berkshire, and died on 22 February 1756. Hearne, writing on 26 April 1707, says that Kennett's 'present [his third] wife wears the breeches, as his haughty, insolent temper deserves'.

=== Character ===
His biographer, the Rev. William Newton, admits that his zeal as a whig partisan sometimes carried him to extremes, but he was very charitable, and displayed great moderation in his relations with the dissenters. He is now remembered chiefly as a painstaking and laborious antiquary, especially in the department of ecclesiastical biography. The number of his works both in print and manuscript shows him to have been throughout his life a man of incredible diligence and application. He was always ready to communicate the results of his researches to fellow-students.

== Works ==
Probably his best-known work, apart from his Compleat History, was his Register and Chronicle, Ecclesiastical and Civil: containing Matters of Fact delivered in the words of the most Authentick Books, Papers, and Records; digested in exact order of time. With papers, notes, and references towards discovering and connecting the true History of England from the Restauration of King Charles II, volume 1 published in London in 1728. The materials for this are preserved in the British Library as part three of the Lansdowne manuscripts (manuscripts 1002 to 1010). The published volume spans 1660 to December 1662; the rest of the work in manuscript runs to 1679. Many other Kennett's manuscripts went into James West's library as president of the Royal Society, being purchased in 1773 by the 1st Marquess of Lansdowne, ending up in the same national collection.

Kennett published more than twelve sermons preached on public occasions between 1694 and 1728, and others in support of charity schools (cited in The Excellent Daughter, 1708; 11th edit. 1807) or of the Society for the Propagation of the Gospel (relevant to his sermon of 1712). His addresses to his clergy at Peterborough on his first visitation were issued in 1720. Kennett was also the author of :

1. Remarks on the Life, Death, and Burial of Henry Cornish, London, 1699, quarto size.
2. Ecclesiastical Synods, and Parliamentary Convocations in the Church of England, Historically stated, and justly Vindicated from the misrepresentations of Mr. Atterbury, pt. i. London, 1701, octavo size.
3. An Occasional Letter, on the subject of English Convocations, London, 1701, octavo.
4. The History of the Convocation of the Prelates and Clergy of the Province of Canterbury, summon'd to meet in the Cathedral Church of St. Paul, London, on 6 February 1700. In answer to a Narrative of the Proceedings of the Lower House of Convocation, London, 1702, quarto.
5. An Account of the Society for Propagating the Gospel in Foreign Parts, establish'd by the Royal Charter of King William III, London, 1706, 4to; translated into French by Claude Grotête de la Mothe, Rotterdam, 1708, octavo.
6. The Christian Scholar, in Rules and Directions for Children & Youth sent to English Schools; more especially design'd for the poor boys taught & cloath'd by charity in the parish of St. Botolph, Aldgate, London, 1708, octavo; 5th edit. 1710, octavo; 14th edit. London, 1800, 12-fold-size; 15th edit. in "The Christian Scholar", volume vi. 1807, 12-fold-size; 20th edit. London, 1811, 12-fold-size; with new edition in London, 1836, 12-fold-size.
7. A Vindication of the Church and Clergy of England from some late reproaches rudely and unjustly cast upon them, London, 1709, octavo.
8. A true Answer to Dr. Sacheverell's Sermon before the Lord Mayor, 5 November 1709. In a Letter to one of the Aldermen, London, 1709, octavo.
9. A Letter to Mr. Barville upon occasion of his being reconciled to the Church of England, printed in "An Account of the late Conversion of Mr. John Barville, alias Barton", London, 1710, octavo.
10. A Letter, about a Motion in Convocation, to the Rev. Thomas Brett, LL.D., London, 1712.
11. A Memorial for Protestants on the 5th of Novemb., containing a more full discovery of some particulars relating to the happy deliverance of King James I, and the three Estates of the Realm of England from the most traiterous and bloody intended Massacre by Gunpowder, anno 1605. In a Letter to a Peer of Great-Britain, London, 1713.
12. A Letter to the Lord Bishop of Carlisle, concerning one of his predecessors, Bishop Merks; on occasion of a new volume [by George Harbin] for the Pretender, intituled The Hereditary Right of the Crown of England asserted, London, 1713, 8vo (two editions in one year); 4th edit. London, 1717, octavo.
13. The Wisdom of Looking Backwards to judge the better on one side and t'other; by the Speeches, Writings, Actions, and other matters of fact on both sides for the four last years, London, 1715, octavo.
14. A Second Letter to the Lord Bishop of Carlisle, upon the subject of Bishop Merks; by occasion of seizing some Libels, particularly a Collection of Papers written by the late R[ight] Reverend George Hickes, D.D., London, 1716, octavo.
15. A Third Letter to the Lord Bishop of Carlisle, upon the subject of Bishop Merks; wherein the Nomination, Election, Investiture, and Deprivation of English Prelates are shew'd to have been originally constituted & govern'd by the Sovereign Power of Kings and their Parliaments ... against the Pretensions of our new Fanaticks, London, 1717, 8vo. This and the two preceding letters to the Bishop of Carlisle, Dr. William Nicholson, gave rise to a heated controversy.
16. Dr. Snape instructed in some matters, especially relating to Convocations and Converts from Popery, London, 1718, octavo.
17. An Historical Account of the Discipline & Jurisdiction of the Church of England, 2nd edit. London, 1730, octavo.

Hearne inserted into a volume of his version of the visually stunning work in the Bodleian Library Leland's Itinerary a critique or correction from Kennett "concerning a passage" Hearne produced in volume four. Some manuscript verses by Kennett on Religious and Moral Subjects, translated from some of the chief Italian Poets, belonged to S. W. Rix in 1855, and manuscript notes by Kennett, written in a Bible, were printed in Notes and Queries for 1885. Sir Walter Scott repeated, in his Life of Swift, p. 137, how Kennett perceived Swift's attendance in Queen Anne's antechamber in November 1713.

His manuscripts now number 935 to 1041 in the British Library Lansdowne collection as tabulated below. Chiefly:

Name	Lansdowne manuscript number(s)
Diptycha Ecclesiæ Anglicanæ; sive Tabulæ Sacræ in quibus facili ordine recensentur Archiepiscopi, Episcopi, eorumque Suffraganei, Vicarii Generales, et Cancellarii. Ecclesiarum insuper Cathedralium Priores, Decani, Thesaurarii, Præcentores, Cancellarii, Archidiaconi, et melioris notæ Canonici continua serie deducti a Gulielmi I conquæstu ad auspicata Gul. III tempora	935
Diaries and Accounts (chiefly commonplace books)	936, 937
An Alphabetical Catalogue of English Archbishops, Bishops, Deans, Archdeacons, &c., from the 12th to the 17th century	962
Biographical Memoranda, many of them relating to the English Clergy from 1500 to 1717	978–987
Materials for an Ecclesiastical History of England from 1500 to 1717	1021–1024
Collections for a History of the Diocese of Peterborough; with Particulars of all the Parishes in Northamptonshire	1025–1029
Notes and Memoranda of Proceedings in Parliament and Convocation	1037
Collections for the Life of Dr John Colet, Dean of St Paul's, with a Letter of Advice and Instruction to Dr Samuel Knight, by whom they were Digested and Published	1030
Materials relating to the History of Convocations	1031
Etymological Collections of English Words and Provincial Expressions	1033
Letters to Bishop Kennett from Dorcas his wife, 1702–28	101

He also made copious annotations in an interleaved copy of the first edition of Wood's Athenæ Oxonienses. This copy was purchased by Richard Gough, from the library of James West, and is now preserved in the Bodleian Library. Kennett's notes are incorporated by Bliss in his edition of Wood. They consist chiefly of extracts from parish registers and from other ecclesiastical documents.

Church of England titles
Preceded by Samuel Freeman	Dean of Peterborough; 1707–1718	Succeeded by Richard Reynolds
Preceded by Richard Cumberland	Bishop of Peterborough; 1718–1728	Succeeded by Robert Clavering
