= Nicholas Battely =

English clergyman and antiquary

Nicholas Battely (1648-1704) was an English clergyman and antiquary, editor of William Somner’s Cantuaria Sacra and brother of John Battely.

== Life ==
Nicholas Battely was born in Bury St. Edmunds, the son of Nicholas Battely, an apothecary. He attended the Bury Grammar School and was admitted a pensioner of Trinity College, Cambridge, on 30 March 1665. He was made a fellow of Peterhouse in 1670 and ordained priest at Ely Cathedral on 18 September 1675. He was Rector of Nowton in Suffolk 1680-85 and Rector of Creeting St. Olave in the same county in 1681. In 1685, he became Rector of Ivychurch in Kent and Vicar of Bekesbourne. He married Anne Pocklington, of Brington in Huntingdonshire. He was the father of Oliver Battely. Nicholas Battely died on 19 May 1704, shortly after the publication of his edition of Somner. He is buried in Bekesbourne church.

== Works ==
In 1703 Battely published a folio volume of the Antiquities of Canterbury. The work was illustrated. Battely also left in manuscript a history of Eastbridge Hospital;, after having been partially printed in John Strype's Life of Whitgift, it was published in John Nichols's Bibliotheca Topographica Britannica, vol. i. (1780). Some notes by Battely on William Dugdale's Monasticon were used by John Lewis in his History of Faversham, 1727.
