= James Fellowes (artist) =

English painter

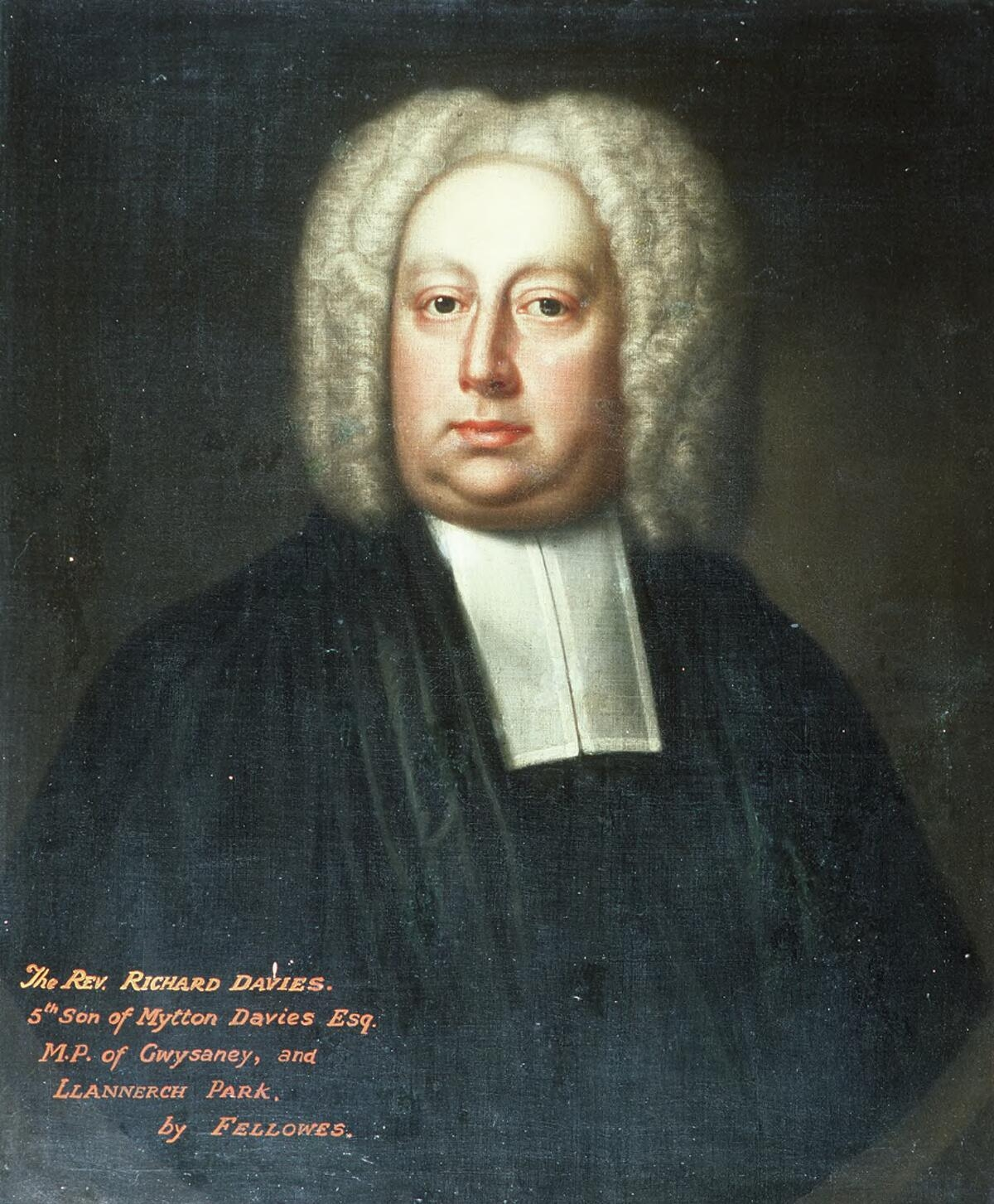
Rev. Richard Davies (1735) by Fellowes

James Fellowes (fl. 1710–1730) was a British portrait-painter.

== Works ==
Fellowes is known for portraits of eminent clergymen of his time. There are portraits by him of Thomas Wilson, bishop of Sodor and Man (engraved by Vertue in 1726), Laurence Howell, the nonjuror, and Humphrey Gower, master of St John's College, Cambridge (engraved by Vertue in 1719).

Fellowes obtained notoriety as the painter of the famous picture of the ‘Last Supper’ which was placed over the communion-table in the Church of St Mary, Whitechapel, by the Jacobite rector, Dr Richard Welton. In this Dr White Kennett, dean of Peterborough, was portrayed as Judas Iscariot, no pains being lost to make the portrait unmistakable. This caused considerable offence, and the figure was altered by order of the Bishop of London, though the picture was allowed to remain.
