= All Saints Cottage, Canterbury =

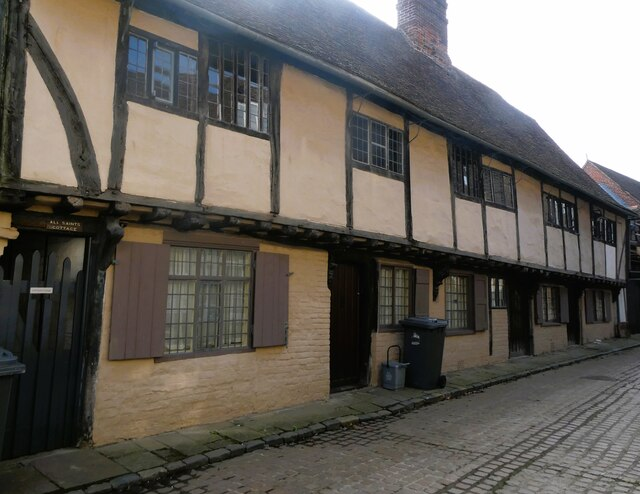
- "elaborate carved brackets in the form of fabulous beasts"

- Location within Kent
- 51.2804°N 1.0786°E
- Type: house
- Location: Canterbury, Kent, England

History
- Built: 16th century

Site notes
- Architectural style: Vernacular
- Governing body: Privately owned

Listed Building – Grade II
- Official name: All Saints Cottage, All Saints Court
- Designated: 3 December 1949
- Reference no.: 1277836

All Saints Cottage, on All Saints Lane, in Canterbury, Kent, England is a building dating from the 16th century. Its origins and original purpose and configuration are all uncertain; it may have been designed as a single house, or as a range of smaller cottages, or have served some commercial or religious function. It is built of timber, and has two storeys, the upper level being supported on joists and brackets carved as "fabulous beasts". All Saints Cottage is a Grade II listed building.

== History and description ==
All Saints Cottage dates from the 16th century. It is of timber-framed construction, described by the Canterbury Historical and Archaeological Society as one of the best-surviving of its type in the city. The original purpose and configuration of the building is uncertain. The society suggests that it was built as a staging point for pilgrims, associated with Eastbridge Hospital. (Note: Canterbury was a noted pilgrimage site, visitors being drawn to the place of the martyrdom of St Thomas Becket. The most famous such pilgrimage is recounted by Geoffrey Chaucer in his Canterbury Tales.) A survey undertaken in 2007 by the Canterbury Archaeological Trust noted the traditional theory that All Saints had been built as a row of up to six independent cottages but discounted this as unlikely due to the existence of a single staircase linking the lower and upper floors.

The building comprises a two-storey range, the upper floor extending over the street and supported by joists with corbels elaborately carved in the forms of "fabulous beasts". (Note: The cottage forms the street frontage of a larger structure, now termed All Saints Court, comprising the cottage itself, with brick wings to either side dating from the 18th century, and enclosing a garden which backs onto the River Stour.) A staircase leads from the lower to the upper floor, which consists of a single room, 77 ft in length. The trust's 2007 report indicates that the upper storey was originally subdivided, although interconnected, and suggests that it may have initially been used for storage, with the ground floor functioning as a row of shops.

By the 20th century the site, then configured as individual dwellings, was derelict and was restored by Walter Sidney Cozens, son of Walter Cozens, an amateur architect and founder of the Canterbury Historical and Archaeological Society. It subsequently served as a Youth Hostel and then as the Woodman School of Dancing. In the 21st century it was reconverted into a private house. All Saints is a Grade II listed building.

== Gallery ==
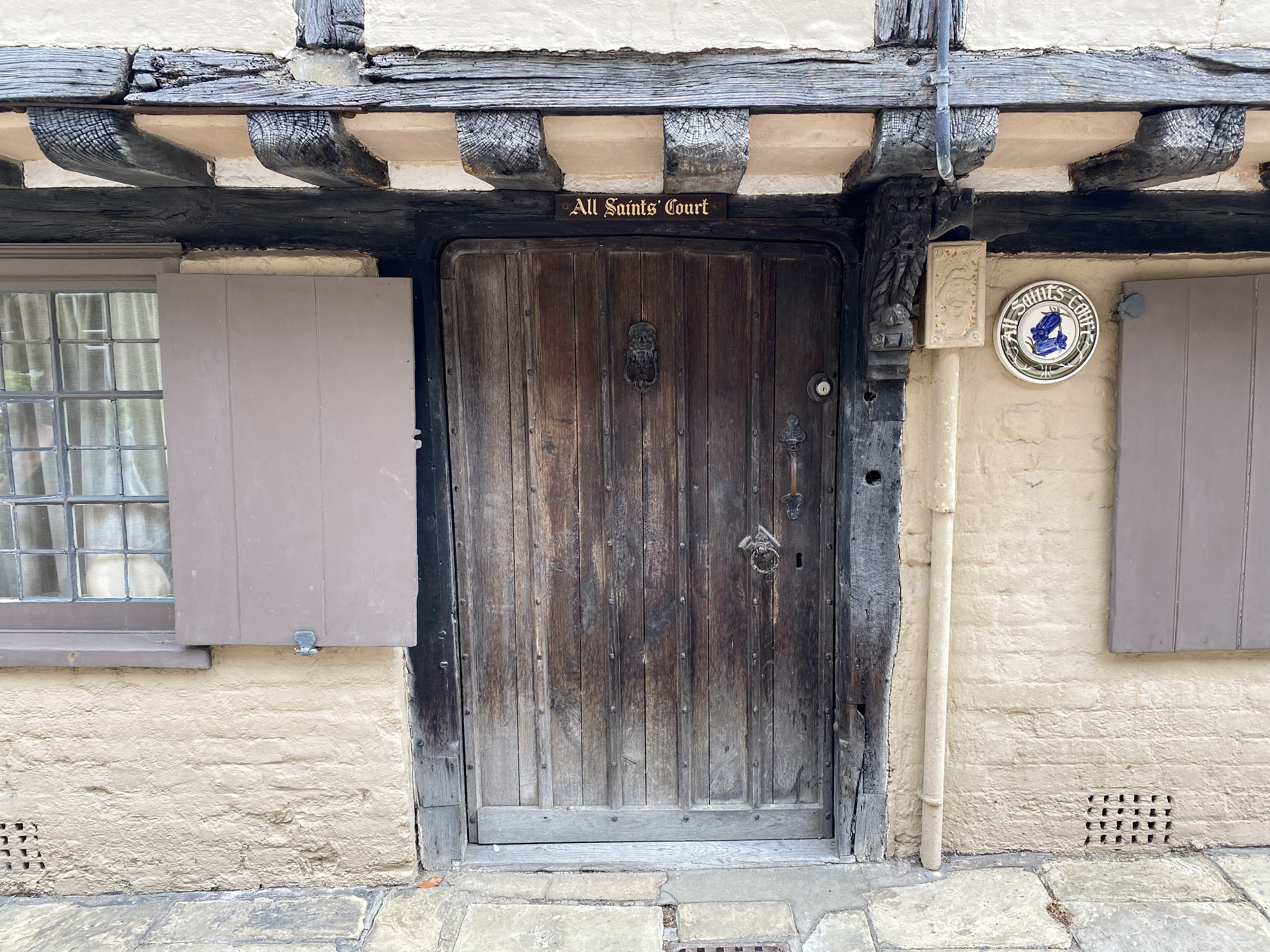
The entrance to All Saints

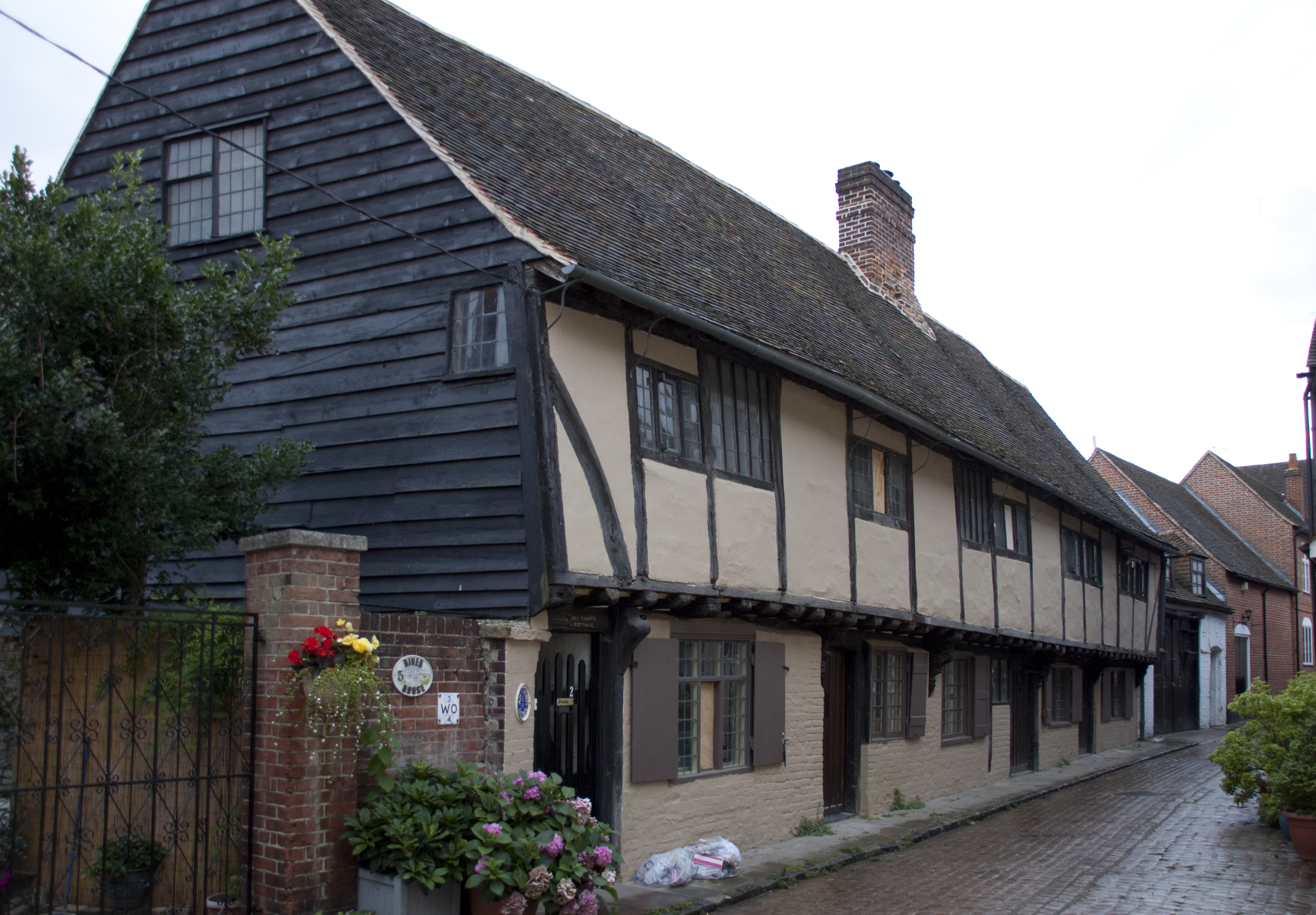
A side and front view

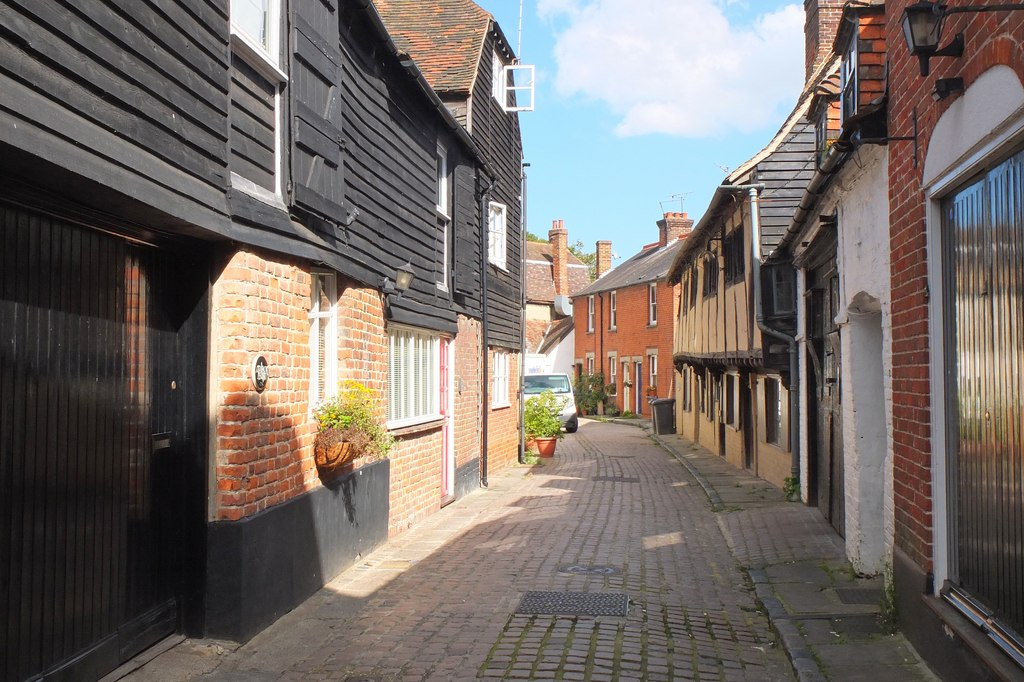
All Saints seen on the right hand side of All Saints Lane

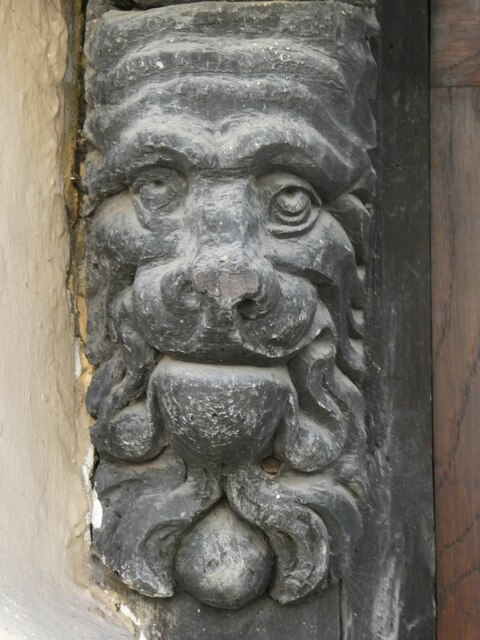
Bracket carving

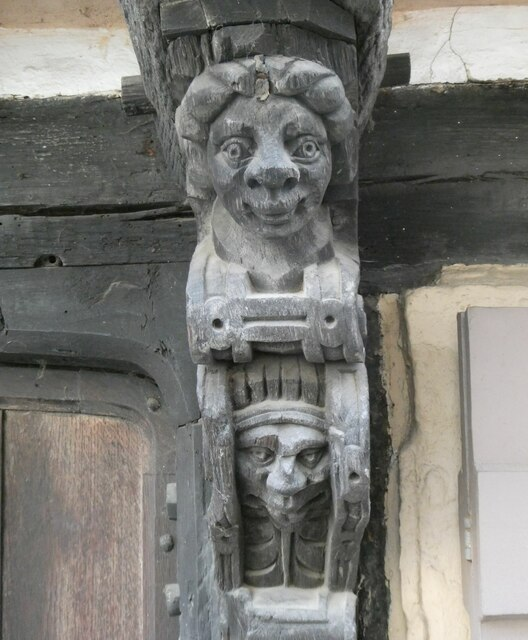
Bracket carving

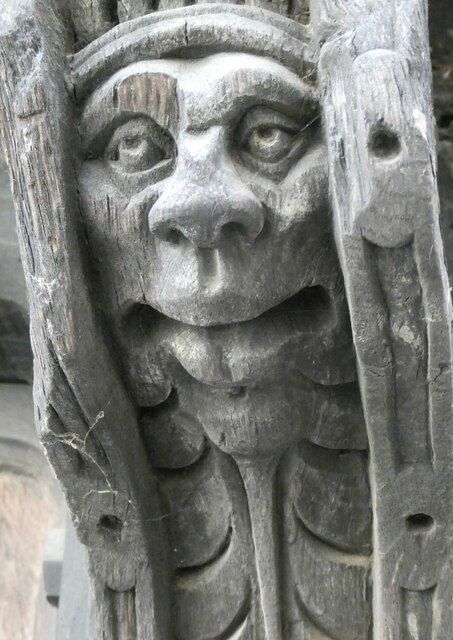
Bracket carving

== Sources ==
- Austin, Rupert (2007). "All Saints Court, Canterbury" (PDF). Canterbury Archaeological Trust: 25–28.
