= Richard Welton =

English Anglican non-juror

Richard Welton (1671/1672 – 22 July 1726) was an English Anglican non-juror.

Welton was born in Framlingham, Suffolk. His father was Thomas Welton, a druggist from Woodbridge, Suffolk. Welton was educated at Gonville and Caius College, Cambridge, where he successively graduated BA in 1692, MA in 1695 and DD in 1708. He married Temperance Goodwyn and they had a son, Richard, who was baptised in 1708.

Being ordained in 1695, Welton was rector of St Mary's, Whitechapel, from 1697 to 1715. In 1714 Welton conceived of a plan to place in the church an altarpiece depicting the Last Supper, with a Whig clergyman as Judas. The painter, James Fellowes, was instructed to portray Bishop Burnet in the semblance of Judas, but, fearing the consequences, he obtained permission to substitute Dean White Kennett with the words "The Dean the Traitor" underneath. The apostle John, depicted as a mere boy, was considered singularly like Prince James Edward, and Christ himself was identified by some with Henry Sacheverell. The altarpiece aroused a great controversy and Welton was attacked in the Whig press. The Chancellor of the diocese viewed it and on 26 April 1714 ordered it to be removed.

Upon the death of the last Stuart monarch, Queen Anne, he refused to take the oath of allegiance to the new Hanoverian king George I in October 1714. He was therefore deprived of his offices on 3 March 1715. Thereafter, he led a nonjuring congregation in Whitehall before the government raided his chapel in 1717 and requested that those assembled take the oath of abjuring the Pretender. Welton refused.

Welton was ordained bishop in the non-juring faction by Dr Ralph Taylor in 1722. He went to America in 1724 where he was briefly rector of Christ Church, Philadelphia, before a royal writ of January 1726 demanded that he return to England. Welton died in Lisbon, Portugal in 1726.
