= Richard Hunne =

English merchant tailor

Richard Hunne was an English merchant tailor in the City of London during the early years of the reign of Henry VIII (1509–1547). After a dispute with his priest over his infant son's funeral, Hunne sought to use the English common law courts to challenge the church's authority. In response, church officials arrested him for trial in an ecclesiastical court on the capital charge of heresy.

In December 1514, while awaiting trial, Hunne was found dead in his cell, and murder by church officials was suspected. His death caused widespread anger against the clergy, and months of political and religious turmoil followed.

== Life ==
In March 1511, Hunne refused to pay the standard mortuary fee, the baby's christening robe, to the rector of St Mary Matfelon in Whitechapel, Thomas Dryffeld, after the funeral of his dead five-week-old son called Stephen. The matter was not pursued by the Church until Hunne and a friend challenged the rector of St Michael Cornhill over the title to a tenement in November 1511. Hunne was then sued by the rector of St Mary Matfelon for the mortuary fee and appeared in the ecclesiastical Court of Audience, presided over by Cuthbert Tunstall, chancellor to the Archbishop of Canterbury, in April 1512. The court found in favour of the rector.

On 27 December 1512, Hunne attended vespers at the same church and the priest refused to proceed with the service until Hunne left. According to the account of Hunne in John Foxe's Acts and Monuments, the priest shouted "Hunne, thou art accursed and standest accursed!", meaning by this that Hunne had been excommunicated by the ecclesiastical court. Hunne responded in January 1513 by suing the priest for slander claiming his character and business had been ruined by the priest's accusation. He also counteracted with a praemunire charge against the church court in which he had been arraigned and argued that its authority derived from a Papal legate and therefore was a foreign court which could have no legitimate jurisdiction over the King of England's subjects.

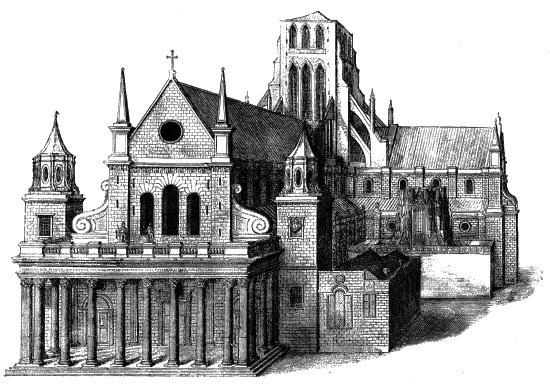
Old St Paul's Cathedral (c. 1660 with Inigo Jones porch) with Bishop's prison (Lollard Tower) centre.

The London clergy responded by again charging Hunne, this time for heresy. Hunne was then sent to the Lollards' Tower of St Paul's Cathedral, after a raid on his house in October 1514 had uncovered an English Bible with a prologue sympathetic to Wycliffe's teachings.

Hunne was found hanging in his cell on 4 December 1514, and the circumstances were suspicious. There was widespread anger against the clergy among the populace of the City of London.

The Church went ahead with Hunne's heresy trial in spite of his death, and he was duly condemned. His corpse was burned at the stake on 20 December.

Hunne's accusers claimed that he had committed suicide, but they could not convince the coroner's jury, which in February 1515, charged William Horsey, chancellor to the Bishop of London, and two other church officials with Hunne's murder.

The political and religious crisis continued to grow. Bishop FitzJames of London wrote to the King's Chancellor, Archbishop Wolsey, asking him to persuade the King to prevent Horsey being put on trial. He said that Horsey would not get a fair trial because of the strength of public feeling, which had built up against the Church: "...if my chancellor be tried by any twelve men in London, they be so maliciously set in favor of heretical depravity that they will cast and condemn my clerk though he be as innocent as Abel." The king eventually intervened to stifle the situation.

Horsey was kept in prison until the anger in London abated. Then he was brought before a civil court, but King Henry had ordered his attorney general to see that the case was dismissed on the grounds of insufficient evidence. Horsey went free, but the public anger was exacerbated by his release, and Parliament became more and more involved.

To calm the situation, Wolsey went before Parliament and on his knees made an apology to them on behalf of the clergy. Wolsey's real aim, however, was to get Parliament to agree to the case being tried in Rome. Then, the king intervened, rejecting Wolsey's proposal and stating that the sovereign of the realm had previously made his decision and that no one had a right to overrule his decision but God himself.

Wolsey later fined Horsey and expelled him 160 miles from the capital. Horsey lived out the rest of his life in great poverty.

== Aftermath ==
In 1515, as a result of this affair, Parliament debated whether to approve a bill to restore to Hunne's children the property that had been forfeited when their father was found, posthumously, guilty of heresy. The House of Commons petitioned Henry VIII to reform the law on mortuary fees and an attempt was made to extend laws against benefit of clergy. None of the proposed laws was enacted.

Foxe recounted Hunne's case as evidence of the unfairness and unaccountability of English ecclesiastical courts on the eve of the English Reformation. He also presented Hunne as a martyr and one of the forerunners of the Protestantism that would soon enter England in the wake of Martin Luther's protest. An anonymous account, "The enquirie and verdite of the quest panneld of the death of Richard Hune which was founde hanged in Lolars tower", published in 1537, suggests that its author also saw parallels between Hunne's case and the Henrician Reformation's attempt to bring ecclesiastical courts under state control.

== Select bibliography ==
- Bernard, G.W. The Late Medieval English Church: Vitality and Vulnerability before the Break with Rome. New Haven and London: Yale University Press, 2012 (Chapter 1: "The Hunne Affair," pp. 1–16).
- Dale, Richard. "The Death of an Alleged Heretic (Richard Hunne: d.1514) Explained" Reformation and Renaissance Review: 15:2: 2013.
- Davis, E. Jeffries. "The Authorities for the Case of Richard Hunne (1514–15)." The English Historical Review 30, no. 119 (July 1915): 477–488.
- Ogle, Arthur. The Tragedy of the Lollards Tower: Oxford: Oxford University Press: 1949.
- Smart, S. J. "John Foxe and 'The Story of Richard Hun, Martyr.'" Journal of Ecclesiastical History 37 (1986): 1–14.
- Wunderli, R. "Pre-Reformation London Summoners and the Murder of Richard Hunne." Journal of Ecclesiastical History 33 (1982): 209–24.
- Marius Richard "Thomas More"- Chapter 8 the Richard Hunne Affair.
