= William Somner =

16/17th-century English antiquarian scholar

William Somner (1598–1669) was an English antiquarian scholar, the author of the first dictionary of the Anglo-Saxon language.

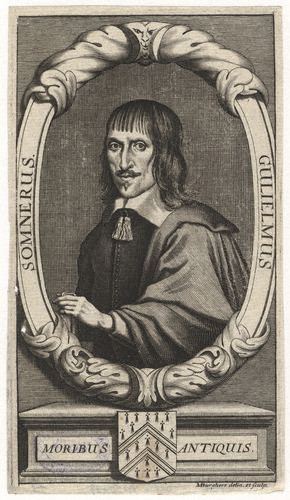
William Somner, 1693 engraving by Michael Burghers.

== Life ==
He was baptised in the church of St. Margaret, Canterbury, on 5 November 1598, but according to a statement of his widow and surviving relatives, the date of his birth was 30 March 1606. His father held the office of registrar of the court of Canterbury, under Sir Nathaniel Brent, commissary. After passing through the free school at Canterbury, he became clerk to his father, and Archbishop William Laud soon advanced him to be registrar of the ecclesiastical courts of the diocese. The archbishop demanded of him a yearly report on the conduct of the clergy in the diocese, but Somner failed to supply. Somner devoted his leisure to studying law and antiquities, and shooting with the long bow.

A royalist, after the execution of Charles I, he wrote an elegy; subsequently, he published another such poem, to which was prefixed the portrait of Charles I, from the Eikon Basilike. He was imprisoned for some time in Deal Castle for endeavouring to obtain subscriptions to a petition for a free parliament in 1659. At the Restoration, he was preferred to the mastership of St. John's Hospital in the suburbs of Canterbury, and he was appointed auditor of Christ Church, Canterbury, by the dean and chapter. He died on 30 March 1669 and was buried in the church of St. Margaret, Canterbury. He was three times married and left several children.

Somner acquired a great reputation as an antiquary, and he numbered among his friends and correspondents Archbishops Laud and James Ussher, Robert Cotton, William Dugdale, Roger Dodsworth, Symonds D'Ewes, Edward Bysshe, Thomas Fuller, and Elias Ashmole.

== The Dictionarium Saxonico-Latino-Anglicum ==
In 1657, John Spelman, at the suggestion of Archbishop Ussher, bestowed on Somner the annual stipend of the Anglo-Saxon lecture founded by his father, Sir Henry Spelman, at Cambridge. This enabled him to complete his principal work, the Dictionarium. It shortly became a standard work in the teaching at the University of Oxford.

== Other works ==
Somner's earliest work was The Antiquities of Canterbury; or a Survey of that ancient Citie, with the Suburbs and Cathedral, London, 1640, dedicated to Archbishop Laud (reissued 1662; 2nd edit, by Nicholas Batteley, London, 1703). At the suggestion of Meric Casaubon, he acquired a knowledge of Anglo-Saxon and then wrote Observations on the Laws of King Henry I, published by Roger Twysden in 1644, with a new glossary. He made collections for a history of Kent, but abandoned this undertaking; a portion of the work was published at Oxford in 1693 by the Rev. James Brome, under the title of A Treatise of the Roman Ports and Forts in Kent, with notes by Edmund Gibson, and a life of the author by White Kennett.

Somner completed work on gavelkind in 1647. He also created an English translation of The Ancient Saxon Laws, which had originally been published in Latin by William Lambard in 1568, though he never published this translation. Additionally, in response to Jean Jacques Chifflet, he wrote a dissertation on Portus Iccius, the location where Julius Caesar embarked on his expeditions to Britain, and identified it as Gessoriacum, which is now known as Boulogne-sur-Mer.. Somner also drew up Ad verba vetera Germanica à V. Cl. Justo Lipsio Epist. Cent. iii. ad Belgas Epist. XLIV collecta, Notae, published in the appendix to Meric Casaubon's 'De quatuor Linguis Commentatio,' 1650. To the Historiae Anglicanae Scriptores Decem, edited in 1652 by Roger Twysden, he contributed a glossary of obscure and antiquated words.

To William Dugdale and Roger Dodsworth's Monasticon Anglicanum, he contributed materials relating to Canterbury and the religious houses in Kent, and he translated into Latin all the Anglo-Saxon documents and many English records for the same work. His last antiquarian production was Chartham News; or a brief relation of some Strange Bones there lately digged up, in some grounds of Mr. John Somner's. This was edited by his brother John, London, 1680, and is reprinted at the end of the first part of the second edition of his Antiquities of Canterbury.
