= James Brome =

English clergyman and travel writer

James Brome (died 1719) was an English clergyman and travel writer.

== Life ==
He was the son of William Brome of Cambridgeshire, and matriculated at Christ's College, Cambridge in 1667; he graduated B.A. in 1671 and M.A. in 1677. He took holy orders, and was vicar of Newington, Kent in 1674, and rector of Cheriton in 1679, both posts he held for life. He was also chaplain to the Cinque Ports, and the Earl of Romney.

== Works ==
In 1694 there appeared the work Historical Account of Mr. R. Rogers's three years' Travels over England and Wales, In 1700 Brome published under his own name Travels over England, Scotland, and Wales, stating in the preface that the previous book was based on his own work. A second edition appeared in 1707.

Another book of travels by Brome appeared in 1712, under the title Travels through Portugal, Spain, and Italy. He also published in 1693 William Somner's Treatise of the Roman Ports and Forts in Kent, and sermons.
