= Eastbridge Hospital of St Thomas the Martyr, Canterbury =

Eastbridge Hospital, The Hospital of St Thomas the Martyr
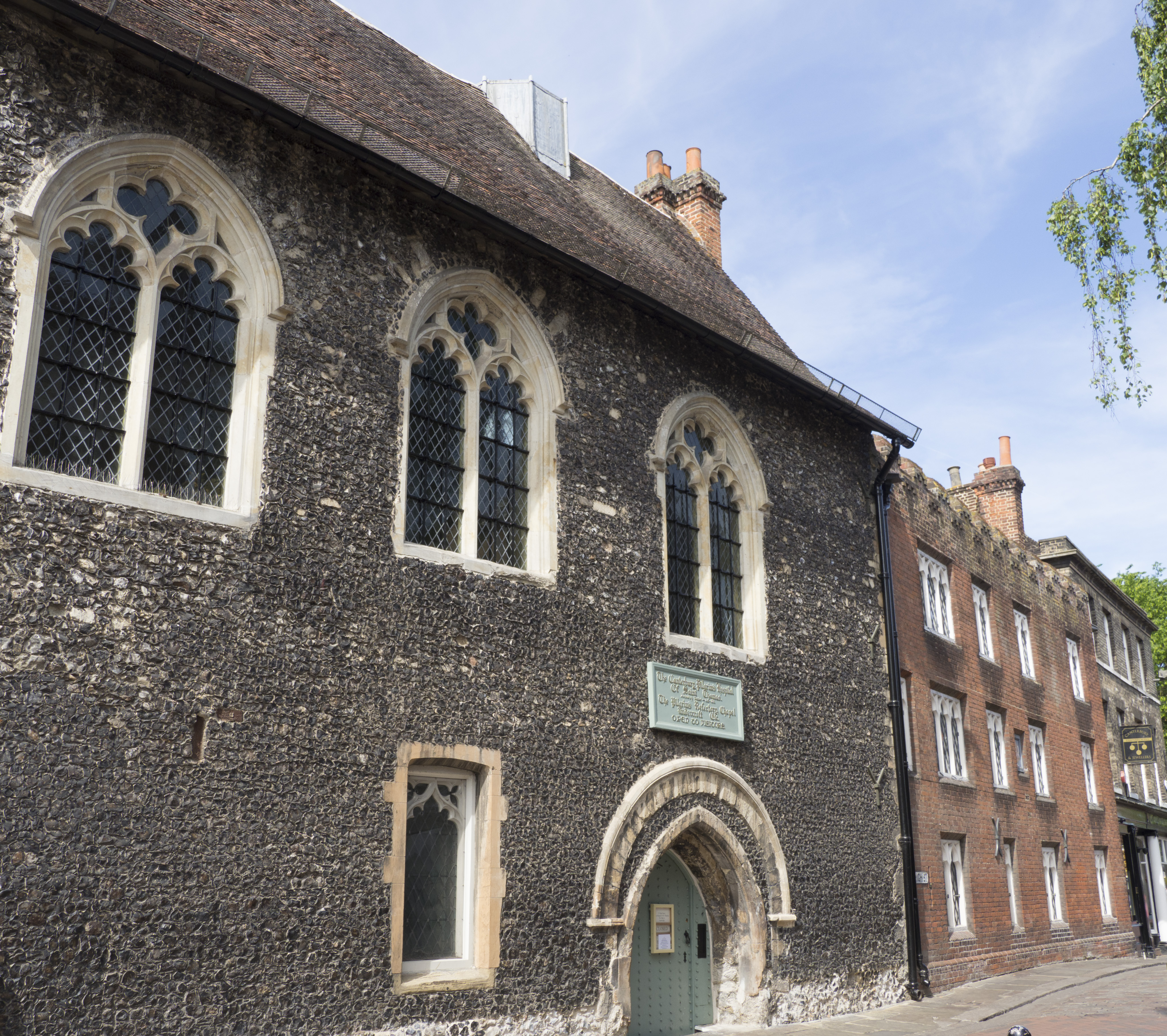

Geography
- Location: Canterbury, Kent, England
- Coordinates: 51.27985°N 1.07833°E

History
- Founded: 12th century

Links
- Website: https://www.eastbridgehospital.org.uk
- Lists: Hospitals in England

Eastbridge Hospital, also known as The Hospital of Saint Thomas Becket the Martyr, is a Hospital in the old sense of the word short for Hospitality and was founded in the 12th century in Canterbury, England, to provide overnight accommodation for poor pilgrims who were travelling to the shrine of St Thomas Becket. It is now one of the ten almshouses still providing accommodation for elderly citizens of Canterbury and is a grade I listed building.

== History ==
=== Founding and original building ===
The hospital is situated on the King's-bridge, next to the Franciscan Gardens Greyfriars, near the Westgate, in Canterbury. It was founded after the brutal murder of Saint Thomas Becket in 1170, possibly as early as 1176, when Canterbury Cathedral became a site of pilgrimage; the hospital provided accommodation for poor pilgrims. The Canterbury Historical and Archaeological Society suggests that All Saints Cottage in the city may have been a subsidiary hostel for the hospital. The earliest name recorded as founder is that of Edward FitzOdbold c. 1180, with further endowments by Archbishop Hubert Walter around 1203. For many years, no special statutes were enacted, nor were any rules laid down for the treatment of pilgrims.

The original building consists of an entrance hall (vestibule), undercroft, refectory and chapel, all built in around 1180. Like the ancient Entrance Hall beneath it, the Pilgrims’ Chapel dates from the twelfth century, but assumed its present proportions in the fourteenth century. The roof of the Pilgrims’ Chapel is a fine example of its kind: the style of woodwork and joinery indicate that it was built around 1285, all beams are authentic except the first two panels which collapsed and were replaced. The Undercroft's original function was as a dormitory, and architecturally shows the period of time where the round-headed arch was giving way to the Gothic style of pointed arch.

The Refectory is a large open room originally used as a dining space. On the north wall is a painting of Christ in Majesty/ Our Lord in Glory, between the symbols of the four Evangelists dating from the thirteenth century. This fresco was only uncovered when the chimney and fireplace installed around the time of the dissolution were removed in 1879, and it has been conserved since its revelation.

=== Medieval additions and reforms ===
Approval for the funding of a Chantry Chapel was sanctioned by Archbishop Sudbury in 1375; the original document confirming this endowment is housed in the Canterbury Cathedral archives. (Chantries were abolished in 1547, and this fell into disrepair until it was reclaimed and restored for its original use in 1969.)

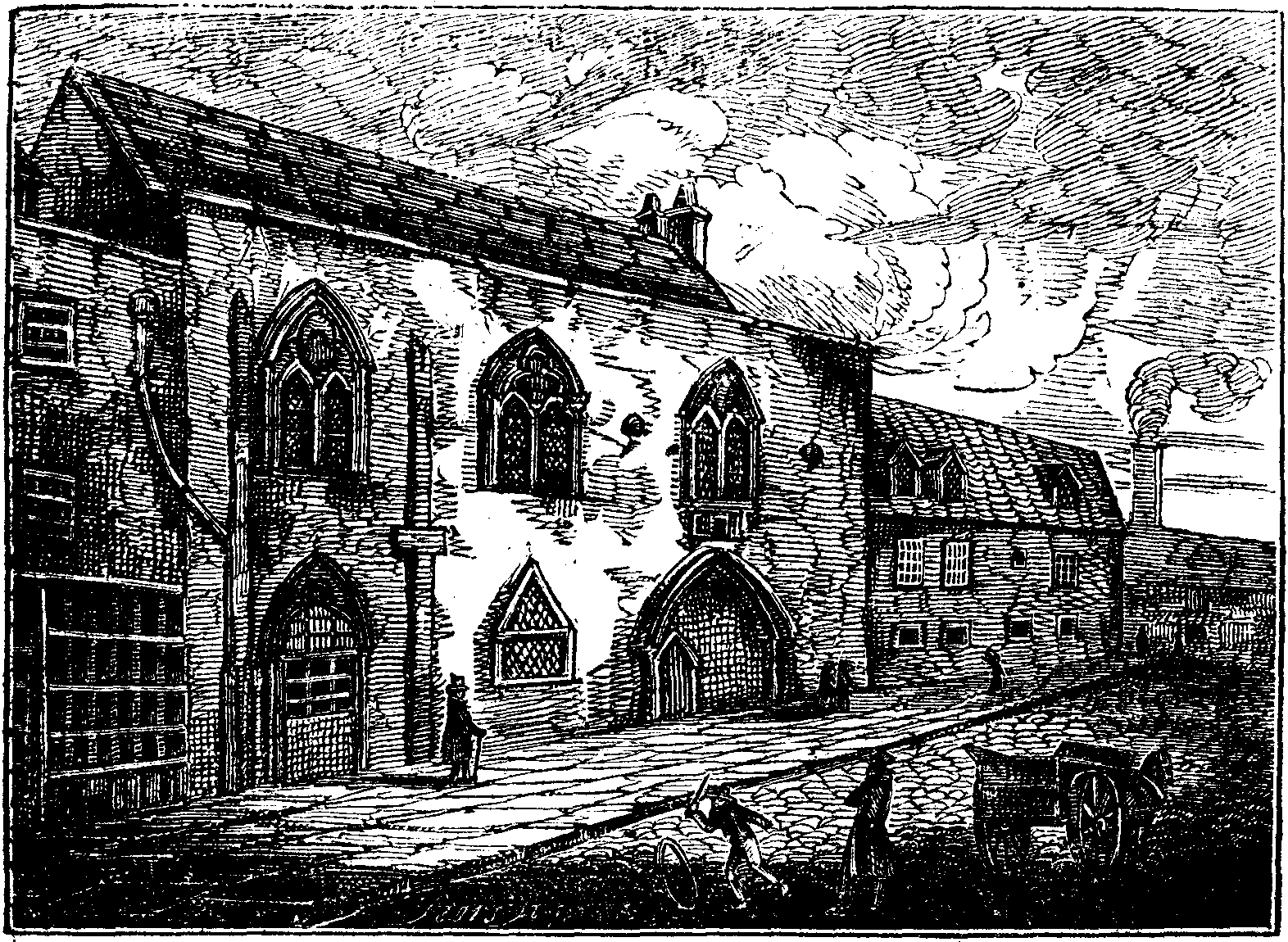
Hospital of St. Thomas, Canterbury, old engraving.

In the fourteenth century the hospital was reformed by Archbishop John de Stratford, during the reign of Edward III; he created ordinances, as well as a code of regulations to be acted on concerning pilgrims. He ruled that every pilgrim in health could rest in the hospital for one night at the cost of four pence, that weak and infirm applicants were to be preferred to those with better health, and that women "upwards of forty" should attend to the bedding and administer medicines to the sick. He also appointed a Master in priest's orders, under whose guidance a secular chaplain served. Further lands and revenues from parishes were given by Stratford and by Archbishop Simon Sudbury.

=== The Reformation and restorations ===
This institution survived the dissolution of the monasteries and other religious houses during the reigns of Henry VIII and Edward VI, although the pilgrimage to St Thomas of Canterbury did not survive this period. In 1569 Archbishop Matthew Parker issued new ordinances governing the Hospital and its Master which specified the maintenance of twelve beds for the 'wayfaring poor' and established a school in the chapel for twenty boys. This arrangement was confirmed by Archbishop John Whitgift by Act of Parliament in 1584.

The school survived until 1880. Inscriptions from the last cohort can be seen on a pillar in the refectory. The chapel was then little used until its restoration by the Master in 1927. Further restoration work has taken place during the twentieth century. Much of this work was financed by sale of some of the hospital's lands at Blean at the foundation of the University of Kent in the 1960s. A list of the Masters of the Eastbridge Hospital up to the end of the eighteenth century is given by Edward Hasted. The newest master is Revd Dr. Perry Butler who was appointed on 29 December 2022.

== Modern Eastbridge ==
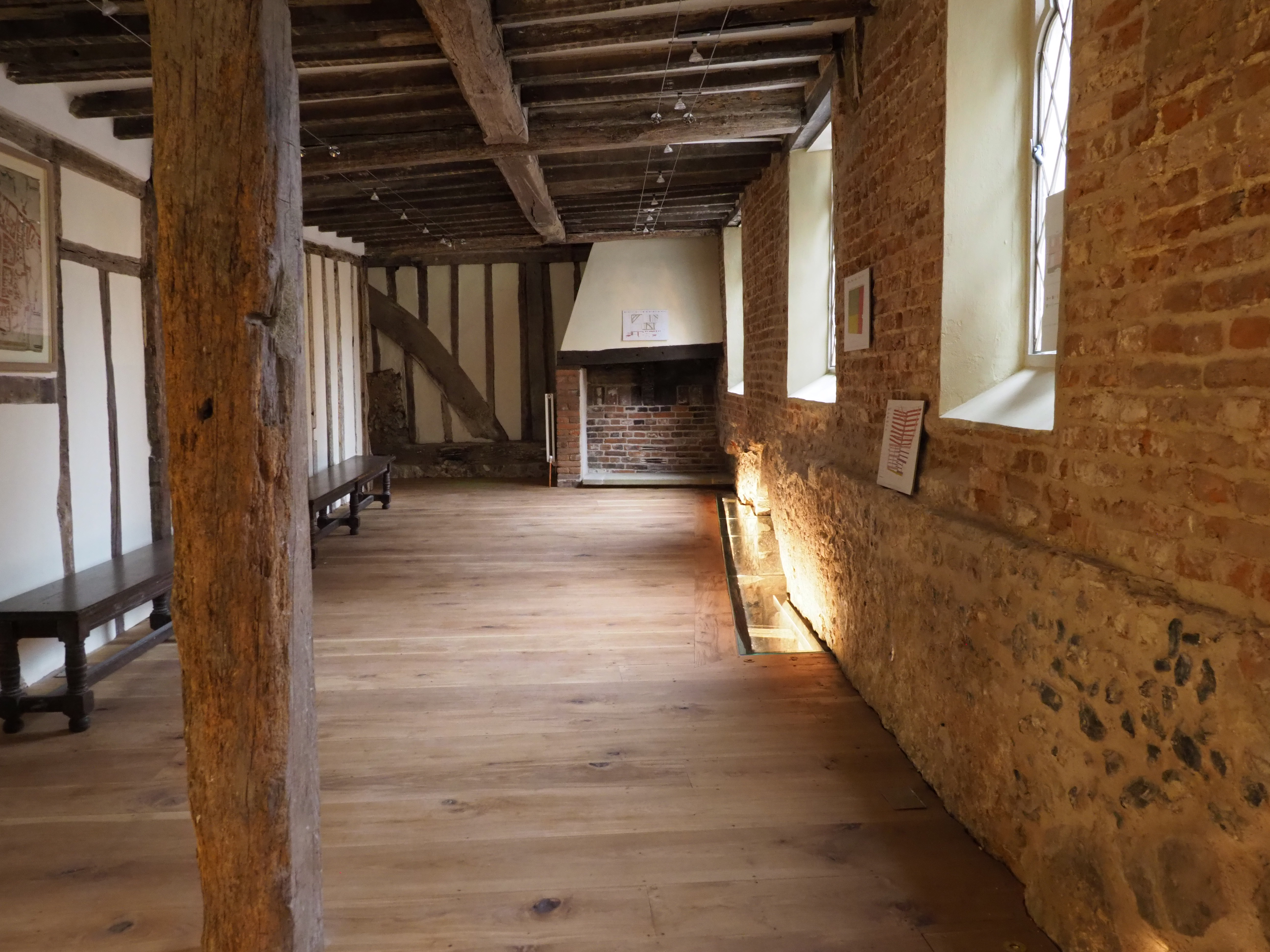
The Juxon Room

Between 2014 and 2019, extensive restoration took place to preserve those rooms situated directly over the River Stour. This work was supported by the Viridor Credits scheme, which funds community, heritage, and biodiversity projects. It was formally opened to the public by the Bishop of Dover on 23 March 2019, and named after Archbishop William Juxon, who was a generous benefactor during his tenure, and donated money in 1660 to repair the Brother's Lodgings.

Eastbridge is still a functional almshouse to this day, providing accommodation for elderly citizens of Canterbury and Ukrainian refugees in areas of the buildings inaccessible to the public. Eastbridge is classed as a Grade I listed building and historical site. The gardens remain open but the building had to close for visitors due to the requirements for significant structural repairs in 2025. In January 2026, it was announced that Eastbridge Hospital was going to be put on Historic England's Heritage at Risk Register.

Eastbridge is administered by Trustees whose main aims are the maintenance of the ancient buildings, which are of national historic interest, and the welfare of the almshouse residents (Indwellers).

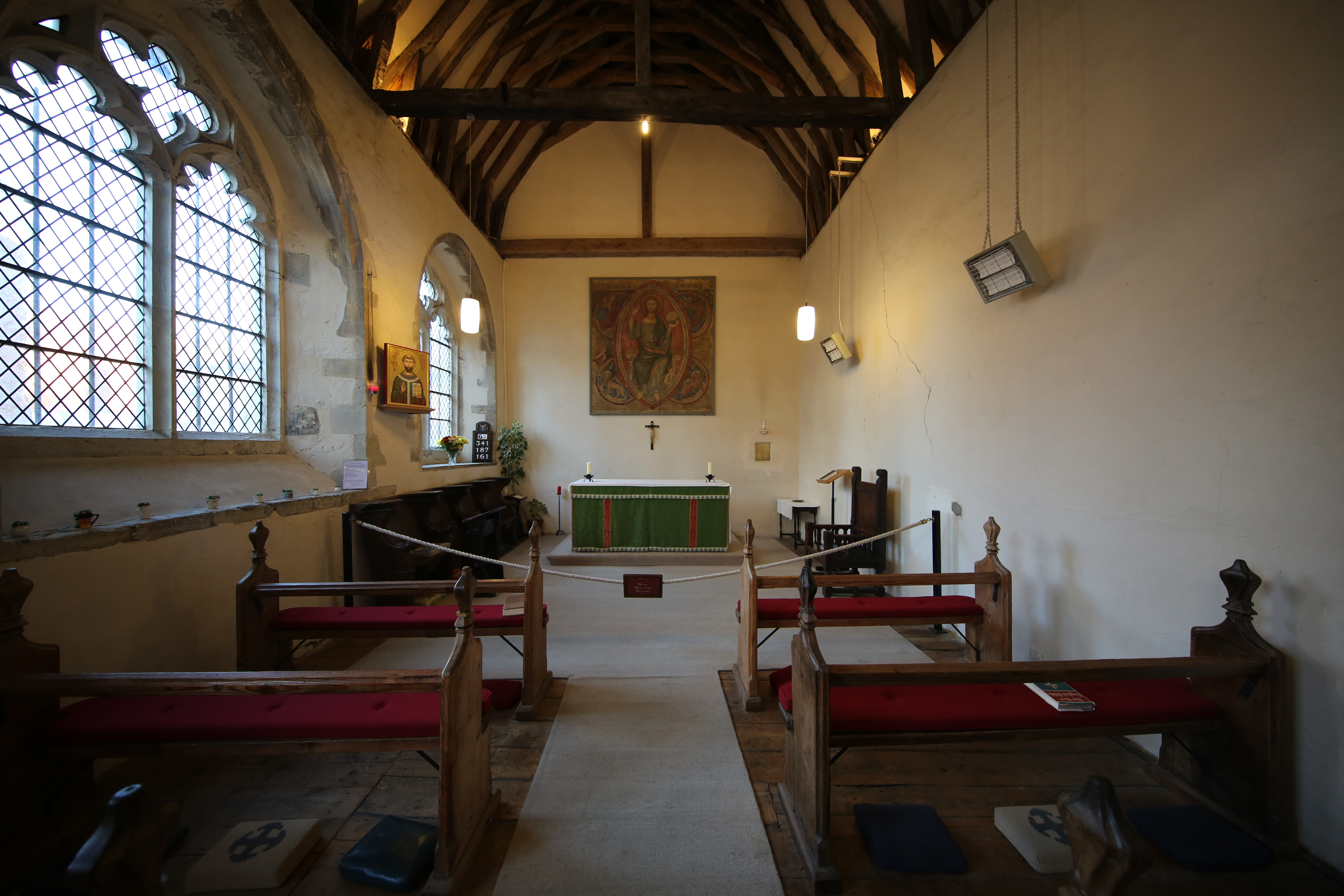
Interior of the Pilgrims Chapel
