= Venn Pilcher =

Anglican coadjutor bishop

Charles Venn Pilcher (known as Venn; 4 June 1879 – 4 July 1961) was a theologian and clergyman born in England. He was also well known as a writer (as well as translator) of hymns. He spent his formative years in England and then moved in 1906 to Canada, where he lived for about three decades. He spent his latter years in Australia.

Pilcher was born in Oxford into a well-known clerical family, among the members of which were Henry Venn (1725-1797), John Venn (1759-1813), Charlotte Elliott (1789-1871), Edward Bishop Elliott (1793-1875), Emily Steele Elliott (1836-1807), Henry Venn Elliott (1792-1865), and Henry Venn the younger (1796-1873). He was educated at Charterhouse School and Hertford College, Oxford. He was ordained in 1903. He was curate of St Thomas' Church, Birmingham and then domestic chaplain to Handley Moule, the Bishop of Durham.

He was a professor of the New Testament at Wycliffe College at the University of Toronto and later of the Old Testament, during which tenure he was also among the founders of the Canadian Society of Biblical Studies. He was canon precentor at the Cathedral Church of St James, Toronto from 1931 to 1936. During his time in Toronto he also played the bass clarinet in the Toronto Symphony.

He subsequently became a lecturer in church history at Moore Theological College, Sydney. He was Bishop Coadjutor of Sydney from his arrival in Sydney until his death. He was a member and the Secretary of the Australian Hymn Supplement Committee, and author of the Preface to the Australian Hymn Supplement to the Book of Common Praise. He wrote hymns and composed tunes for both the original hymn book (produced in Canada) and for the Australian supplement. He was also a keen supporter of the Zionist cause.
