= E. S. Elliott =

English poet, hymnwriter, novelist (1836–1897)

- Born: Emily Elizabeth Steele Elliott; 22 July 1836; Brighton, Sussex, England
- Died: 3 August 1897 (aged 61); Mildmay, Islington, London, England
- Occupations: writer; editor
- Spouse: William Godsmark
- Children: 4
- Parent: Edward Bishop Elliott
- Relatives: Henry Venn Elliott; Charlotte Elliott; Henry Venn; John Venn; Sir Richard Steele, 3rd Baronet (1775–1850)
- Writing career
- Pen name: E. S. Elliott
- Genres: poetry; hymns; novels; children's literature
- Subject: religion

Emily Steele Elliott (Emily Elliott Godsmark after marriage; 1836–1897), better known by the pen name of E. S. Elliott, was an English religious writer of poetry, hymns, and novels, as well as the editor of a missionary magazine. Several of her hymns were used at St Mark's Church, Brighton, where her father, Rev. Edward Bishop Elliott, served as incumbent, and several were contributed to the Church Missionary Juvenile Instructor, of which, for six years, she was the editor. Her hymns were translated into various languages, including Chinese, German, Portuguese, Sinhala, and Spanish. Elliott was also the author of numerous well-known books.

== Early life ==
Emily Elizabeth Steele Elliott was born in Brighton, Sussex, England, 22 July 1836. (Note: Smith (1903) remarks that the "date of her birth is unknown, but it is supposed to be about 1825", while Baker & Frere (1909) record 1835.) She was the third daughter of the Rev. Edward Bishop Elliott, author of the Horae Apocalypticae. Rev. Elliott's siblings included the divine, Henry Venn Elliott, and the hymnist, Charlotte Elliott; their maternal grandfather was Henry Venn of Clapham Sect; and their uncle was John Venn, Rector of Clapham. Emily's maternal grandfather was Sir Richard Steele, 3rd Baronet (1775–1850).

== Career ==
Among Christmas hymns designed for children, two popular ones were written by Elliott. One begins with the line, "There came a little child to earth," which was popular in England, but was not known to many singing congregations in the U.S.. The second hymn was just as suitable for adults as for youth. It was privately printed in 1864 for the use of the choir and school of St. Mark's Church, Brighton. The hymn has passed into almost every standard hymnal published in the U.S. at the turn of the 20th century. It starts with, "Thou didst leave Thy throne and Thy kingly crown", and is usually sung to the music by Barnby or Matthews.

She wrote a large number of hymns which were issued in book form in 1866. Her Chimes of Consecration, a volume of 70 hymns and poems, was published in 1873, and her Chimes for Daily Service in 1880. The latter contains 71 hymns in two parts. The second part of 48 hymns is also published separately as Under the Pillow, for use as a large type hymnbook with corresponding tune book for hospitals and infirmaries and the sick generally.

For many years, Elliott worked for the missionary cause. For six years, she edited the Church Missionary Society's magazine for children, then named the Church Missionary Juvenile Instructor. In later years, she rendered service by her Bible-readings for the women candidates in training at The Willows. She was an organizer of the Christmas Letter Mission, and was an Honorary Life Member of the Church Missionary Society.

== Personal life ==
She married William Godsmark (b. 1829). Their children included, Caroline (b. 1859), William (b. 1861), Edith (b. 1873), and Annie (b. 1877).

By 1887, she was living in London.

She was an invalid in her later life, suffering from heart disease. Emily Elizabeth Steele Elliot died suddenly on 3 August 1897, (Note: Baker & Frere (1909) record 5 August 1897.) at the conclusion of an operation conducted at her home in Mildmay, Islington, London. An inquest returned a jury verdict of death by misadventure.

== Selected works ==
- Under the microscope; or, 'Thou shalt call me My father', 1861 (text)
- Village Missionaries; Or, "To Every One His Work" (1861) (text)
- Stepping Stones. A book for the young, 1862 (text)
- Father's coming home : a tale 1862 (text)
- The Soldier's Return, 1863 (text)
- Wayside pillars, 1866 (text)
- Copsley annals preserved in proverbs, 1867 (text)
- The End of Life and the Life that Has No Ending, 1867 (text)
- The Regular Service, 1868 (text)
- I must keep the chimes going, 1868 (text); 1869 (text)
- The Vendale lost property office, 1869 (text)
- One thing, 1870 (text)
- Matty's hungry missionary-box, and the message it brought, 1871 (text)
- Susie Grant; Or, the Lost Property Office, 1872
- Chapters on Bible classes, 1873 (text)
- "It's His Way," and Other Stories, 1873 (text)
- All the Day Long, 1873 (text)
- Stories for workers, 1873 (text)
- The two watches : and other stories 1874 (text)
- Chimes of consecration and their echoes 1873 (text)
- "What would Mrs. Crumple Say?" A Chronicle of Apperley 1875
- From new year to new year and from all the world round, 1877 (text)
- Chimes for Daily Service, 1880
- The feast of sacrifice and the feast of remembrance, or, The origin and teaching of the Lord's Supper, 1884 (text)
- "Do We Believe It?": A Home Question, 1892
- Expectation Corner, 1897
