= Brighton Gay Men's Chorus =

Community choir and registered charity in Brighton and Hove, England

- Genres: popular, Broadway, choral, classical
- Years active: 2005-present
- Website: www.brightongmc.org

Brighton Gay Men's Chorus (BGMC) is a community men's chorus and registered charity based in Brighton and Hove, England. Founded in 2005, the chorus is part of the wider LGBTQ+ choral movement in the United Kingdom.

== History ==
Brighton Gay Men's Chorus was founded in 2005. A 2025 retrospective in Scene Magazine said the group began as “a small group of gay friends meeting together to socialise and sing”.

The chorus has become a regular presence in Brighton's LGBTQ+ and cultural life through concerts, Brighton Fringe performances, and appearances at Brighton & Hove Pride.

In 2025 the chorus marked its 20th anniversary with the show Retrospective: 20 Years of Brighton Gay Men’s Chorus at St George’s Church, Kemptown.

== Organisation ==
The Charity Commission entry for the chorus states that its charitable objects include promoting public education through the study, practice and public performance of choral music, assisting other charitable causes, advancing the education of gay and gay-friendly men in Brighton and Hove in choral music, and promoting equality and diversity for the public benefit. Membership is open to anyone who self-identifies as male and as LGBT+-friendly, and with no audition for new members.

== Artistic leadership ==
Joe Paxton is occasionally employed by the chorus along with other musicians who conduct, improvise and create the shows. The musical conductors roles have included not only conducting but also scripting shows, stage directions, lighting, and longer-term creative planning alongside the committee who contribute so much.

== Performances and reception ==
The chorus performs a repertoire that includes pop, musical theatre, Eurovision material, and classical works.

On 6 April 2024, Brighton Gay Men's Chorus performed in ABBA Gold at Brighton Dome, exactly fifty years after ABBA won the 1974 Eurovision Song Contest on the same stage. The concert featured Eurovision winners including Charlotte Perrelli, Måns Zelmerlöw, Katrina, Linda Martin and Emmelie de Forest and formed part of the international celebrations marking the anniversary.

Reviews in local and LGBTQ+ media have described BGMC as a strong live act with an emphasis on theatrical presentation. Reviewing the 2024 show BGMC Air, Andrew Kay in The Latest wrote that the choir were “really on top form” and praised the group's “fun, fine singing and passion”.

A 2025 review in Brighton and Hove News said the audience left with “a new sense of what the Chorus is all about” and described “warmth, support and community” as strongly present in the show.

Scene Magazine has reviewed multiple Brighton Gay Men's Chorus productions over several years, including Seven Deadly Sins in 2016, Divas! in 2022, After Dark in 2023, and Retrospective in 2025.

The chorus has appeared at Brighton Dome on multiple occasions, and have performed on the BBC.

== Community role ==
Brighton Gay Men's Chorus float at the Brighton Pride parade on 13 August 2011.

The chorus has also taken part in Brighton & Hove Pride's community parade. In 2023 its parade float referenced the campaign against Section 28 and marked 20 years since the repeal of the law's effects on education in the UK. |The chorus describes itself as “first and foremost a community choir” and said one of its charitable aims was to promote equality and diversity. It has also raised money for other local charities.

== See also ==
- Brighton Fringe
- Brighton Pride
