= Laughland =

Laughland is an English surname. Notable people with the surname include:

- Iain Laughland (1935–2020), Scottish rugby union player
- Isabella Laughland (born 1991), English actress
- John Laughland (born 1963), British journalist
- Tory Laughland (1944–1994), British social worker
