= Maria Pearson =

Maria Pearson may refer to:

- Maria Pearson (activist) (1932–2003), Native American activist
- Maria Pearson (murderer) (born 1956), British murderer
