= Biblical studies =

Academic Study of the Bible

Biblical studies is the academic application of a set of diverse disciplines to the study of the Bible, with Bible referring to the books of the canonical Hebrew Bible (the Tanakh) in mainstream Jewish usage and the Christian Bible that includes the canonical Old Testament and New Testament. For its theory and methods, the field draws on disciplines ranging from ancient history, historical criticism, philology, theology, textual criticism, literary criticism, historical backgrounds, mythology, and comparative religion.

== Definition ==
The Oxford Handbook of Biblical Studies defines the field as a set of various, and in some cases independent disciplines for the study of the collection of ancient texts generally known as the Bible. These disciplines include but are not limited to historical criticism, archaeology, hermeneutics, textual criticism, cultural anthropology, history, the history of interpretation, sociology, theology, and patristics.

== Academic societies ==
Several academic associations and societies promote research in the field. The largest is the Society of Biblical Literature (SBL) with around 8,500 members in more than 80 countries. It publishes many books and journals in the biblical studies, including its flagship, the Journal of Biblical Literature. SBL hosts one academic conference in North America and another international conference each year, as well as smaller regional meetings. Others include the European Association of Biblical Studies, the Canadian Society of Biblical Studies, the Evangelical Theological Society, the Institute for Biblical Research, the American Schools of Oriental Research, and the Catholic Biblical Association.

== Biblical criticism ==
Biblical criticism is the scholarly "study and investigation of biblical writings that seeks to make discerning judgments about these writings". Viewing biblical texts as being ordinary pieces of literature, rather than set apart from other literature, as in the traditional view, biblical criticism asks when and where a particular text originated; how, why, by whom, for whom, and in what circumstances it was produced; what influences were at work in its production; what sources were used in its composition; and what message it was intended to convey. It varies slightly depending on whether the focus is on the Hebrew Bible, the Old Testament, the letters of New Testament or the canonical gospels. It also plays an important role in the quest for a historical Jesus.

It also addresses the physical text, including the meaning of the words and the way in which they are used and its preservation, history and integrity. Biblical criticism draws upon a wide range of scholarly disciplines, including archaeology, anthropology, folklore, comparative religion, oral tradition studies and historical and religious studies.

New Testament and Old Testament rhetorical analysis differ because of the context in which they were written. The New Testament was written during a time that had many new Greek and Roman ideas on literature and rhetoric, which provide an avenue for what was known and give additional resources to study New Testament texts in those contexts.

Old Testament texts were not written in the same context, and due to their ancient nature have few additional resources to refer to for common themes in rhetoric and literature. There are many abstract text styles in the Old Testament, including historical accounts, proverbs, poetic texts, praise texts (such as psalms) and prophetic texts. The New Testament is different in that it has primarily two styles present: the gospels, which are mostly historical accounts, and the letters, or epistles.

When it comes to textually analyzing and criticizing the New Testament, there are a couple of eclectic approaches to understanding the text on a deeper level. External criticism in the context of biblical studies involves understanding the who, what, and when of New Testament texts. It does not analyze within the text itself, which is referred to as internal criticism. External criticism focuses on the source and dates of text and what type of text it is (in the New Testament, that is mostly a gospel account or a letter to a church or person). Internal criticism focuses specifically on the content and nature of the texts. Things like the literary style and the theology of the author may affect how one reads the text. That may require some external criticism knowledge since who the author is will shine light on why they may be saying what they are saying.

== Biblical exegesis ==
Biblical exegesis is the explanation or interpretation of the scriptures traditionally known as The Bible. Much biblical exegesis is founded upon historical-literary dynamics, either using scripture to interpret history and science, or using science and history to interpret scripture.

This is particularly important when applied to the person of Jesus Christ and the Gospels in the New Testament. Many people agree that Jesus was a real historical person, but whether he was truly the Son of God is debatable among many people, and this distinction proves to be important for one's interpretation of texts and whether the Gospels should be read literally or symbolically.

The Book of Revelation is very different from the other books of the Bible, drawing need for additional analysis to determine whether it should be read literally or symbolically. The goals of the author of the book (John) also have implications toward how one reads the book. If one reads Revelation as a literal unfolding of the end times vs reading Revelation as a highly symbolic book, there will be different outcomes in the interpretation of particular sections.

Additionally, one's view of the scriptures as sacred and written by God or as a historical text has implications on one's interpretation of text.

== Textual criticism ==
Textual criticism is a branch of textual scholarship, philology, and literary criticism that is concerned with the identification and removal of transcription errors in texts, both manuscripts and printed books. Ancient scribes made errors or alterations when copying manuscripts by hand. Given a manuscript copy, several or many copies, but not the original document, the textual critic seeks to reconstruct the original text (the urtext, archetype or autograph) as closely as possible. The same processes can be used to attempt to reconstruct intermediate editions, or recensions, of a document's transcription history. The ultimate objective of the textual critic's work is the production of a "critical edition" containing a text most closely approximating the original.

There are three fundamental approaches to textual criticism: eclecticism, stemmatics, and copy-text editing. Techniques from the biological discipline of cladistics are currently also being used to determine the relationships between manuscripts.

The phrase "lower criticism" is used to describe the contrast between textual criticism and "higher criticism", which is the endeavor to establish the authorship, date, and place of composition of the original text.

== Biblical history ==
Historical research has often dominated modern biblical studies. Biblical scholars usually try to interpret a particular text within its original historical context and use whatever information is available to reconstruct that setting. Historical criticism aims to determine the provenance, authorship, and process by which ancient texts were composed. Famous theories of historical criticism include the documentary hypothesis, which suggests that the Pentateuch was compiled from four different written sources, and different reconstructions of "the historical Jesus", which are based primarily on the differences between the canonical Gospels.

There is much controversy around using the Bible as a historical source. The Old Testament is supposed to serve as a continuous account of the establishment of ancient Israel. While many historians agree that figures like King David and King Solomon are real historical figures, there comes trouble when seeking to affirm or deny events like the creation of the world and the flood of Noah. The use of terms like "myth" vs "history" also creates controversy due to some connotations that each word has. Oftentimes "myth" or "mythical" texts are seen as not true stories, where as "history" or "historical" texts are seen as fact. Mythical stories can also sometimes be seen as stories which serve some sort of religious or moral lesson, but are not necessarily true, however this does not mean that true historical stories do not have religious and moral lessons that accompany them. These views on myth and history are examples of a few difficulties when it comes to analyzing the Old Testament as a historical text.

New Testament historical analysis is also difficult due to the nature of the original texts that we can analyze, specifically their translatability as well as how oral tradition had effects on written tradition during the formation and canonization of gospel texts and the teachings of Jesus.

== Original languages ==
The Hebrew Bible, the textual basis of the Christian Old Testament (although with order rearranged and some books split into two), was written in Biblical Hebrew, although a few chapters were written in Biblical Aramaic. Deuterocanonical books removed from the Old Testament in some Protestant Christian Bibles are variously written in Hebrew, Greek or Aramaic. The New Testament was written in Koine Greek, with possible Aramaic undertones, as was the first translation of the Hebrew Bible, known as the Septuagint or Greek Old Testament. Therefore, Hebrew, Greek and sometimes Aramaic continue to be taught in most universities, colleges and seminaries with strong programs in biblical studies.

There are few original Old Testament/Hebrew Bible manuscripts, and while the ancient translations (such as the Septuagint) are available, there comes a problem with comparing the translation to the original Hebrew (because we have it). This may lead to problems of establishing the reliability of translations like the Septuagint. In order to overcome this, researches have come up with methods to use the very few manuscripts we have and continually draw conclusions and compare to original texts using those conclusions to provide more reliability to available texts. In order to indicate if a translation is authentic or not, it is crucial to look for keywords that may seem unique and that are not translated from a root language such as Hebrew or any of the other original languages. This shows that there are many other languages present in the translations that seems as if it was reinvented over and over again. However, it is normal to see such a change, and it shows the difference between the original writings versus the final outcome of the translations. Although the Bible was originally written in Hebrew, it was first translated into Old Greek in the 3rd century BC. This was still translated into the Old Testament. However, when the Bible was translated into the New Testament, it was now in Greek, or in other words, Koine Greek which is also known as Biblical Greek.

== See also ==
- Biblical hermeneutics
- Biblical theology
- Bible study (Christianity)
- Chronology of the Bible
- Doctor of Biblical Studies
- Exegesis
- Quranic studies
