= Horae Apocalypticae =

Eschatological study written by Edward Bishop Elliott

Horae Apocalypticae is an eschatological study written by Edward Bishop Elliott. The book is, as its long-title sets out, "A commentary on the apocalypse, critical and historical; including also an examination of the chief prophecies of Daniel illustrated by an apocalyptic chart, and engravings from medals and other extant monuments of antiquity with appendices, containing, besides other matter, a sketch of the history of apocalyptic interpretation, the chief apocalyptic counter-schemes and indices."

"Horae Apocalypticae (Hours with the Apocalypse) is doubtless the most elaborate work ever produced on the Apocalypse. Without an equal in exhaustive research in its field, it was occasioned by the futurist attack on the Historical School of interpretation. Begun in 1837, its 2,500 pages are buttressed by some 10,000 invaluable references to ancient and modern works. Horae Apocalypticae consists of 4 volumes. It ran through five editions (1844, 1846, 1847, 1851 and 1862)." In 1868, he published a Postscript to comment on the events, or perceived lack of events, marking the prophetically significant years, 1865/7.

== Purpose and method of the book ==
Charles Spurgeon wrote in 1876, the year after Elliott died, that Horae was "the standard work on the subject." It remained the standard until Robert Henry Charles published his commentary on the Book of Revelation in 1920 and is still widely admired. Although Edward Elliott defended a traditionalist position, he was keen to apply new historical techniques to Revelation. He called these allusive contrast. This meant studying the text in its original social context and comparing it with neighbouring social contexts. He tried to understand what the words of Revelation would have meant to their original hearers and readers. Allusions shared between John and his audience ensured each word meant much more than its dictionary definition. In particular, John's audience was attuned to images and emblems in a way modern interpreters find hard to grasp. For example, when John said of the locusts of the fifth trumpet, "and they had hair as the hair of women and their teeth were as the teeth of lions. And they had breastplates, as it were breastplates of iron" clear and defined metaphors were being used which the audience could pick up upon; there was no fanciful or poetic superfluity to the words chosen.

Elliott wrote to support the supernatural inspiration of scripture against rationalist attacks from within the Protestant faith. He believed that if he could show "the fulfilment of Apocalyptic prophecy in the history of Christendom since St John's time" then he had gone a long way towards showing how essential the supernatural was to an understanding of all scripture. He was strict as to what proof would be required. It needed distinct events, predicted beforehand, without vagueness and which "could not have been foreseen with human sagacity."

Edward Elliott viewed history as "God's education of the world" - a constant struggle between sin and gospel-grace. People could see God's purpose, he believed, only if they could relate past, present and future. Because God's word was perfect, nothing could be added, nor taken away. But revelation was designed to reveal and, given adequate attention to detail, he believed a single shining truth would emerge to human understanding.

In his own view, prophecy was, "God's declared purpose of making the near approach of the consummation evident at the time of its approaching; yet, till then, so hidden as to allow of Christians always expecting it ... a declaration well agreeing with that with which Daniel's book closes, that the prophecy was to be sealed only till the time of the end." This leaves unspoken who will have the ears to hear, the eyes to see and the ability to distinguish the true signs from the false and lying ones.

He endured numerous attacks on his system by those who disagreed either his method or his conclusions. These attacks intensified as Elliott's timetable began to break down. His original scheme anticipated "the time of the end" as forecast in Daniel 12:12 closing around 1865. He held to the view of a pre-millennial advent of Christ. As the mid-1860s approached undramatically, he was forced to shift his timeframe so that the end was no longer anticipated until 1941. This perceived change of heart caused considerable scoffing in the popular press.

== Authorship and date of Revelation ==
Reverend Elliott believed Revelation to have been written down by John the apostle. For Elliott, only a connection with the apostle ensured a claim to divine inspiration. Without it, the Apocalypse could be dismissed as a later forgery and Elliott knew that those of anti-millennial views would be only too happy to oblige. His justifications for apostolic authorship were:-

- that Irenaeus said it was so and Irenaeus being the grand-disciple of John knew the facts,
- that the difference in language between the Gospel of John and the Apocalypse was inherent in the different nature of the books and didn't show that different authors were involved. The Gospel was a (later) work of mature reflection whereas the Apocalypse was written down as dictation "in the spirit",
- that only the apostle would have had sufficient authority to send such unwelcome comments to the seven churches and expect to command a hearing,
- that no human being other than the beloved disciple could have written such a book.

Edward Elliott believed Irenaeus was correct to say that Revelation was written "towards the end of the reign of Domitian", perhaps 95 CE. (Domitian was assassinated September 96). He did not accept any gap in time between the vision occurring and the writing of the book. He rejected the idea of an earlier Neronian date for Revelation because persecution under Nero would have meant martyrdom in Rome. Nero derived no pleasure from banishing people to Patmos. He also believed arguments for an early date based upon apparent similarities of terminology between Paul's epistles and Revelation were self-contradictory because they would require Paul to be quoting Revelation at three places in 1 Thessalonians and at that time there could have been no church at Ephesus for Revelation to have mentioned. Finally, he believed Laodicea to have been destroyed by an earthquake in 60CE and not completely rebuilt for at least another ten years so, if John wrote to a complacent and prosperous church there, it must be at a later date.

These two considerations taken together imply that the author of Revelation was a man in his late eighties sentenced to penal servitude on Patmos. Such a man would have every reason to feel persecuted. Age would also give him a pivotal position in the problem of the delayed Second Coming of Christ. He would be the only member of Christ's circle not to have died. As a result, Elliott suggested that Revelation was an attempt to use Daniel to provide comfort for those congregations dismayed by the apparent failure of parousia. Hence the offer of a millennial rule of martyred saints prior to any general resurrection of the righteous at the end of the millennium.

The storyline of Revelation can be found at Chronology of Revelation.

== Letters and opening visions ==
Reverend Elliott considered if John's letters to the seven churches in Asia Minor were in themselves prophetic. He set out a table of different systems which advocated this view and found the discrepancies were so massive as to convince him there could be no prophetic intention in the letters themselves. The letters were a record of the things that are, not of the things that shall be. To this end, he suggested that the opening vision section (beginning Chapter 4) did not impart new information. The idea was to recall familiar prophecies: Isaiah 6:1, Ezekiel 1: 4 & 20, and Exodus 24: 9 & 10.

== The Book with Seven Seals ==
The book with the seven seals was both an unfolding scroll and a living drama in two parts. Firstly, there was the apocalyptic scenery. The tabernacle Moses knew and a court similar to that of an oriental sovereign were in the foreground. Mount Zion was in the background. The whole of the Roman Empire stretched away into the far distance. None of this was ornamental, but emblematic and choreographical of "the combined secular and ecclesiastical history of Christendom" having a proper unity of effect, as significant as it was beautiful. Reverend Elliott said we have to situate John as part of the drama, a prophet performing prophetic acts, not as a detached observer. Yet not all of what occurred was to be seen. Reverend Elliott quoted John Milton, "millions of spiritual creatures walk the earth, unseen both when we sleep and when we wake."

Secondly, the Plan and Order of the book were written within and without, sealed seven times. Reverend Elliott took as his text, "I will show thee the things that must happen after these things." He believed this set aside "interpretations based on the principle of the Apocalypse being a prophecy figurative only of the times yet future." "Accordingly, the three septenaries of Seals, Trumpets and Vials will be interpreted by me as connected and consecutive series; - the seventh Seal unfolding itself in the seven Trumpet visions, the seventh Trumpet in the seven Vials: and this with no intermission or interruption." He considered the more complex overlapping and interlocking chronology of Joseph Mede to be unnatural and wrong because truth must be simple.

The chronology was given by:-

- the temporary prosperity, decline and fall of pagan Rome was the subject of the first six seals (96CE to 395)
- the ravage of Rome-in-apostasy by Goths, then Saracens, then Turks was the subject of the first six trumpets
- the Protestant Reformation began during the sixth trumpet
- the judgment upon, and overthrow of, the papacy was the subject of the outpouring of the vials of God's wrath and was "now far advanced in progress of fulfilment."

"What a field for historic research lies here before us!"

== Illustrative materials for pagan Rome ==
For secular history, Reverend Elliott relied upon Edward Gibbon. The link between history and Revelation was shown by illustrations of coins, medals, antiquities and inscriptions from the catacombs, as well as by quotations from classical authors. He rejected George Stanley Faber's attribution of the four horsemen to the military empires of Babylon, Persia, Macedonia and Rome as well as Rev. Dr. Alexander Keith's suggestion they were primitive Christianity, Islam, Popery and Jacobin Atheism. Equally, he rejected Joseph Mede's idea that the rider on the white horse was Christ. He was sure John referred to earthly events, not abstractions. He described how the Romans used emblems and badges as representations of corporate bodies. The resulting emblems were:-

- the first white horse and rider with a bow represented the virtuous emperor riding off to war. He carried a bow because he was Nerva, a Cretan.
- the second red horse and rider with a sword told of a time of civil war and martial despotism summed up in the ruling motto, "enrich the soldiery; despise the people."
- the third black horse and rider with a balance scale represented a time of unjust taxation whereby the producing provinces of the empire were robbed to satisfy the legions and to provide handouts for the populace of Rome. Economic depression resulted, but no famine. The words used in Revelation are a mocking reference to the sort of laws which were supposed to guarantee fair dealing but were, in reality, merely "records of the crime."
- the fourth pale horse bore a rider called Death, the word used as in the expression, The Black Death. This took the story to 292CE.
- the fifth vision was the altar-court of the apocalyptic temple where the souls of Christ's faithful martyrs cried, "How long?" This was the Diocletian persecution. The only sacrifice left for Christians to make was of themselves. The martyrs remaining to be slain would be killed in the reign of antichrist, following the replacement of the Roman empire by the ten kingdoms.
- in the sixth unsealing, a complete breakdown of the natural world occurred from which rich and poor flee in terror. No earthly foe caused their panic. Reverend Elliott said the sixth unsealing was the political revolution caused by Constantine's adoption of Christianity as state religion (the Milan decree of 313). He accepted that the language used in Revelation sounded like a reference to the Great Day of Yahweh rather than an earthly political change. But, he said, this could not be so, else the story must end at that point. This was a glimpse of the real end yet to come. In Elliott's scheme, the sealing of the righteous remnant and the worship with palms were included as part of this sixth unsealing.

== The 144,000 Servants of God ==
These were the Christians (Jewish or otherwise) marked with a seal by Christ so that their sufferings and martyrdom would not go in vain. Not everyone who claimed to be a Christian would be recognised as such by Christ the Lamb. Constantine's sponsorship of Christianity created a new breed of career Christian. The true faith of "the vicarious and propitiatory atonement of the Son of God" was replaced by ritualism, by Platonist allegory and by superstitious practices "as if the sacraments when duly accepted from the priest's hand were potent drugs, or chemical antidotes, infallibly dispersing the poison inherited from Adam!"

When Edward Elliott revisited the topic, in connection with Revelation 14:3, it was to emphasise that, even under the Protestant dispensation, only an elect remnant understood free grace and could "learn the new song". He traced their history through Philipp Jakob Spener, Richard Hooker, Richard Baxter, George Whitefield and John Wesley.

== One Third destroyed ==
In Reverend Elliott's view, anyone who tried to interpret the prophecies as wholly literal, or wholly symbolic, would be disappointed. The secret was to relate the symbols to the historic reality. In the case of the first four trumpets, that reality was the Gothic invasions. In symbolic terms one-third of the land, trees, sea and rivers would be destroyed. The third in question he identified as Britain, Gaul, Spain, Italy and North Africa as this was one part of the threefold split of the Empire between Constantine, Lucinius and Maximin. The four invasions he listed as:-

- Goths under Alaric and Rhadagaius - to 410CE
- Vandals under Genseric - to 439
- Huns under Attila - to 453
- Heruli under Odoacer - to 493

This scheme was criticised. The details of the disasters prophesied did not seem to match what the tribes did historically. Alaric and Rhadagaius did not have much in common. Theodoric, perhaps the most successful Goth, went unmentioned. The threefold split of Empire had preceded this period by a hundred years or more. Reverend Elliott may have enjoyed greater success relating the spiritual state of the Empire to John's prophecies. He saw this as a time when "the mystery of iniquity" was intensifying ready for the onslaught of the Beast. Specific superstitions of apostasy were the invocation of saints, purgatory, imposition of a priesthood between the people and God, prayers for the dead, private confession and indulgences.

“The fifth and sixth trumpets cover the destruction of the Eastern Empire, the fifth Trumpet indicating the Islamic Saracens and the sixth the Osmanli Turks.”. Reverend Elliott was aware of possible underlying contradictions. Islam was also a reaction against the kind of idolatry which was a feature in the apostasy of the Christian church. A similar difficulty was experienced with the iconoclast reaction against superstition in the Eastern Christian church. Elliott acknowledged that many of the figures involved in the Roman apostasy, such as Pope Gregory the Great, were men of high piety and scholarship.

These prophecies are said to be brought to conclusion when Mehmed II united the Ottoman Empire with the incorporation of Baghdad in 1530 and the killing of one-third was said to be achieved by the taking of Constantinople (1453) by the use of cannon fire.

== The hour, and day, and month and year ==
After the fall of Constantinople, it was no surprise the western church failed to repent. Revelation 9:20 prophesied as much. Edward Elliott pointed to the marked contrast between material progress and spiritual stagnation at the time. On the civic side, there was

- the growth of free towns and communes
- the increased importance of trade and self-importance of the mercantile classes
- the growth of learning across Europe from Oxford to Prague
- the popular enthusiasm for printing and vernacular literature.

But, on the spiritual side, there was

- superstition and repackaged heathenism which reached full decadence with the introduction of the rosary in 1460
- worship directed towards "the spirits of dead men deified", particularly Canterbury which was dedicated to Beckett, not God
- bloodthirsty vindictiveness from the Inquisition amid the persecution of Waldenses, Taborites and others
- the abject failure of all attempts at internal reform such as the mendicant friars and the Council of Constance (1414)

Reverend Elliott devoted nearly forty pages to a detailed description of the scene at the papal election (10 March 1513) of Leo X, drawing out how he felt it was a perfectly inverted parody of the vision of the mighty angel at Revelation 10: 1-4 and thus confirmed the papacy in the role of antichrist and usurper of Christ's prerogative and glory. The appearance of the angel in the prophecies caused Edward Elliott to part company with his great forerunner in interpretation, Joseph Mede. For Mede, the angel's little book was a "new and distinct prophecy" concerning the fate of the church, whereas the sealed book that the Lamb had opened had dealt only with the fate of the Empire. But Reverend Elliott did not see it this way. For him, the mighty angel (who was none other than Christ himself) heralded the Reformation. The Reformation could only have been by "direct intervention of Divine providence" because nothing could have been less likely to succeed by human agency alone given all the failed precedents. The Reformation was, effectively, "the republication of the gospel" and the tenth of the city to be destroyed was a quit-rent taken to show God owned all.

== Prophecy and Reformation ==
Reverend Elliott set himself the task which he felt had defeated others before him: how to relate the prophecies of Revelation to the historical events of the Reformation. Although the reformers saw themselves as fulfilling prophecy, Luther and Calvin shared low opinions of the theology of Revelation and did not pursue the subject. Elliott engaged in a minute examination of both the prophecies and Reformation history to show how, in his view, they were in accord. In this phase of the vision, John was to be seen as if performing prophetic acts as a representative man; a sort of Everyman. The particular chronological problem posed by Revelation 10: 5 - 7 was solved by proposing that the proper translation was not "that time shall be no longer" but rather "that the time shall be no further prolonged" - referring to the present time of evil. Thus, the mystery of God which will come to an end is the passing away of providence itself.

The reformed church wished to establish itself on precedents from an early, unsullied church. But knowledge of the subject was lacking, "covered with darkness and corrupted by innumerable fables" until Flacius Illyricus produced the Magdeburg Centuries around 1556. This established the pedigree needed to date the 1260 years of the Two Witnesses. Of these witnesses, Edward Elliott said "living confessors are intended" but, because of the long timescale involved, he referred to G. S. Faber's suggestion of two lines of witnesses which he took to mean the anointed priests and the more irregularly constituted band of prophets. He quoted Hengstenberg, "The two witnesses are ideal persons, who appear in a multitude of real witnesses."

Reverend Elliott set out what he saw as the history of "Christ's secret ones" or "the Church in the wilderness" by which the spirit of primitive Christian doctrine was kept alive during the epoch of the Beast. Witnesses listed (amongst others) were Alcuin, Claude of Turin, the Paulicians, Peter de Bruys, and the Poor Men of Christ who had originated in Cologne. Edward Elliott specifically identified these as a proto-Protestant underground. He said the prophetic period of 1260 years was simultaneous for all its manifestations; the period during which the gentiles trample the temple court, the period of the woman in the wilderness, the reign of the Beast and the period in which the two witnesses prophesy. When he first wrote, this period of 1260 years had yet to come to an end. But he wanted the murder and resurrection of the witnesses to coincide, not with the end of the period, but with the final persecution of the Waldenses followed by their resurrection represented by the Reformation. Were this to be ruled out, then the Reformation would not be marked by any special prophetic fulfillment and the period when the gospel message would be almost totally extinguished would still be in the future. This he found unpalatable. He got around the dilemma by suggesting that the sense of Revelation 11:7 would be better taken as 'when the witnesses had perfected their testimony' rather than 'when they had finished their testimony'. This meant the death of the witnesses was during their prophetic period and not at its end so there need be no hiatus to allow for the events preceding their ascension. Then, the millennium could start as soon as the prophetic period had ended which was what was required of Daniel 7: 25.

The 'great city' where all this took place was Rome. But Revelation 11: 8 described it as "where also our Lord was crucified" which seemed to point to Jerusalem. Again, Reverend Elliott preferred a slightly different wording, "where also their Lord hath been crucified" thus the witnesses were murdered in Rome in remembrance of Christ's death and the precise occasion was the Fifth Council of the Lateran of 1512. For the witnesses' resurrection, Edward Elliott quoted Pope Adrian VI, "The heretics Huss and Jerome seem to be alive again in the person of Luther." The witnesses' ascension he assigned to the Peace of Passau 1552.

== Daemonia ==
Edward Elliott engaged in a discussion of Joseph Mede's Apostasy of the Last Times. He considered the distinction between the Devil (in the singular) and demons (in their generality). The Devil or Satan, he said, meant "the Accuser" or prosecutor of mankind as used in a courtroom sense. His opposite number was "the comforter", or Christ as humanity's advocate. Thus, the devil, although evil, has had his part to play in the heavenly system. Zechariah 3: 1 says, "And he showed me Joshua the high priest standing before the angel of the Lord, and satan standing at his right hand to resist him."

It is not the devil but the multitude of demons which Revelation cites as the source of idolatry. Idols are empty and lifeless until humans imbue them with evil powers thought of as being derived from their ancestors. The sort of demons Christ cast out are both real and malign in intent. But, said Edward Elliott, this was very little different from the cult of the saints practised by the church in apostasy. It was the deification of dead men.

== The Parenthetic Visions ==
Edward Elliott's historical approach meant he had difficulty explaining how these visions were a necessary and intrinsic part of the overall scheme of Revelation. In relating these new prophecies to world history, he was forced to go back over events with which he had already dealt. This created an unfortunate sense of redundancy and repetition. In his view, the writing within the sealed scroll dealt primarily with secular history whereas the writing on the outside dealt with ecclesiastical history. This recapitulation was necessary so that the reader could understand who the Beast was, a matter complicated by Edward Elliott's somewhat unusual insistence that there was only one Beast involved. This meant that the Beast from the sea, the Beast from the abyss, the Beast that killed the two witnesses, the dragon that menaced the woman in travail, the 'little horn' of Daniel 7: 7 - 14, the antichrist and the 'man of sin' from 2 Thessalonians 2: 1-12 were all manifestations of exactly the same entity. His best argument for this view was that, if they were not all identical, what became of them all? The Beast from the sea would seem still to be out there somewhere.

The use of a single Beast meant that only seven heads and ten horns needed to be identified once and for all. Edward Elliott, in common with other commentators of his day, was looking for forms of government, not individuals. The first five were agreed to be Kings, Consuls, Dictators, Decemvirs, and military tribunes. The sixth was emperors but it could not mean all emperors as this would mix Christians and pagans as component parts of the Beast. The solution came with the stated appearance of a diadem on the dragon's head. This pointed to the replacement of the traditional military-style emperor by an oriental-style absolute monarch and this happened under Diocletian who thus began the term of the seventh head. In its turn, this pagan head was wounded to the death by Theodosius' edict suppressing paganism. The eighth replacement head was to be the papacy. Elliott quoted Flavio Biondo "The princes of the world now adore and worship, as perpetual dictator, the successor not of Caesar but of the fisherman Peter: that is, the supreme pontiff, the substitute of the afore-mentioned emperor."

The ten horns are the Romano-Gothic kingdoms: the Anglo-Saxons, Franks, Allemans, Burgundians, Bavarians, Vandals, Suevi, Heruli, Visigoths and Ostrogoths. The three horns required to be removed to fit Daniel were the Ostrogoths, the Vandals and the Lombards (sic) because they were a proximate threat to Rome.

Edward Elliott set out his view of how the papal antichrist developed. He believed it had reached its mature state by the First Council of Ephesus 431CE. It began with a misuse of Matthew 16:18 to imply that Peter himself was the rock upon which the church was founded whereas the better sense was that he was instructed to build the church on the rock of the gospel. Historically, the church at Rome was founded upon Paul, not Peter who was unlikely to have been first bishop. Paul's description of the man of sin "sitting in the temple of God showing himself as God" was fulfilled by the pope sitting on the high altar at St Peter's to receive the adoration of the cardinals on his consecration day. Further, Jean Gerson's statement "The people think of the pope as the one God who has power over all things in heaven and earth" fulfilled Revelation 13:3 "All the world marvelled after the Beast." Lastly, the bull Unam Sanctam said that "it was essential to the salvation of every human being to be subject to the Roman Pontiff."

== Number of the Beast ==
Regarding the Number of the Beast, Edward Elliott showed how routine and widespread this type of application was. Thoth had been 1218, Jupiter 717, Apollo 608, the word 'abraxas' had been coined to give 365 and the name Mithras was mis-spelled to the same ends. As regards 666, Edward Elliott agreed with Irenaeus on "Lateinos", the name of Daniel's 4th empire and the name of a man.

== The French Revolution ==
Although Edward Elliott's scheme had only one prophetic period of 1260 years to satisfy all the occasions in Revelation where such a period was called for, this was reflected in two temporal periods which did not quite coincide. One ended in 1789 (1260 years after the Justinian code); one ended in 1866 (1260 years after the Decree of Phocas). This circumstance arose because prophecy was inscribed both within (imperial history) and without (church history) the seven-sealed scroll. In terms of the text of Revelation, these came together in the temple of God appearing opened in heaven which was mentioned the first time at 11: 19 (the seventh trumpet sounding) and the second time at 15: 5 (the appearance of the angels with the seven vials of wrath). Thus, the seven vials - or bowls - were established as the outcome of the seventh trumpet sounding.

With the end of the war of the Ottoman empire with Austria and Hungary, the third woe came quickly in the form of the 'earthquake' of the French Revolution which completely fulfilled the prophecy of the nations being angry. In Reverend Elliott's scheme, five vials had been poured when he wrote, the sixth was under way and the last was yet to come. There was a marked resemblance between the vials and the Exodus plagues and the first four vials mirrored the first four trumpets. The first five vials were:-

- poured on the earth - The Declaration of the Rights of Man, August 18, 1789 and the Public Repudiation of Christianity November 7, 1793,
- poured on the sea - the Haitian revolution and the pan-European naval war with Britain,
- poured on the rivers - Napoleon's continental campaign along Po, Rhine and Danube,
- poured on the sun - the expiry of the Holy Roman Empire following the Battle of Austerlitz 1806,
- poured on the throne of the Beast - Rome relegated to second city of the French Empire and the Treaty of Tolentino February 17, 1797.

The sixth vial was seen as a fulfillment of the prophecy of the little horn in Daniel 8 and 11 "most of which is a straight piece of historical writing cast in the form of a prophecy." Whilst this has usually been seen as referring to the plight of the Jews under Antiochus IV Epiphanes, or possibly under the Roman empire, Reverend Elliott saw it as being about the desolation of Christian places of worship in Greece and the Greek insurrection leading to the Battle of Navarino in 1827. The 'kings from the east', who have an important role to play in the Revelation prophecy, are taken to be the Jews returning to a Jewish homeland. The apostolic angel flying through mid-heaven was taken to portend the evangelical missionary work in Britain and beyond associated with William Wilberforce.

== The Three Frogs ==
In Revelation 16: 13, three frogs came from the mouths of the dragon, the Beast and the false prophet to work mischief in the world. These Edward Elliott identified as atheism, revolution and priestcraft. A wide selection of historical 'evils' was identified with these: the Roman Catholic Relief Act 1829, the attacks on established institutions which accompanied the passage of the Reform Act 1832 (although no stand was taken on the franchise issue itself) the atheist element in the Chartist press, Essays and Reviews, Bruno Bauer and David Strauss, the 'papal aggression' which resulted in the Ecclesiastical Titles Act 1851, the reliance of British governments upon the Commons' votes of Irish MPs, the expulsion of the Dutch from Belgium, John Keble's The Christian Year, "the pretended creations and transformations of Crosse, Darwin, etc" and the removal of restrictions upon trade with India which, he said, meant "the opportunity was seized to send out thither bales of the works of Tom Paine" and that these ideas were woven by Muslim writers into their criticisms of Christianity.

Edward Elliott also admitted the visions of the harvest and the vintage presented problems. His contemporaries were divided between those who saw them as a mercy upon the good (a harvest should be a time of joy and celebration) or as a judgment on the bad (as the warlike language used implies). Elliott saw it as a judgment which was a reward for the martyred saints. He felt this answered the pre-millennial question, "For how could the saints' blessedness and reward be viewed as imminent if a millennium of the spiritual evangelization of the world were expected to precede it?" But by saying all the Beasts and dragons were really one and then identifying these closely with the antichrist, Edward Elliott came close to assigning all the evil in the world to the papacy.

The seventh and last vial was to be poured on the air. Edward Elliott expected a polluted moral atmosphere to corrupt normal society but admitted this figure of speech to be unusual in prophetic writing.

== Consummation of All Prophecy ==
Edward Elliott's last task was to show that Revelation provided the exact fulfilment of all prophecy in Daniel, Isaiah, Ezekiel and others.

For Daniel, he dismissed the argument, dating from Porphyry, that Daniel was 'prophecy after the event' for the following reasons:-

- that Christ spoke of the fulfilment of Daniel (for example, Matthew 24:15) so it was illogical for Christian believers to reject Daniel's inspiration,
- that the things foretold in Daniel related to the Romans, to the Messiah and to other events long after the Maccabees, so it could not all have been written with hindsight,
- the language employed in the text is too archaic for a later writer (although Elliott said this was only true for the early chapters of Daniel),
- that it would be very difficult to insert fraudulent chapters into such a well-known book at a later date,
- that the prophetic timescale employed would be useless for any fraudulent purpose.

But this still left unanswered a problem which had troubled Isaac Newton of how Jewish prophecies could be adapted to a Christian setting without simply excluding the Jews. He then considered a contrasting range of prophetic utterances from Isaiah, Joel, Ezekiel and Zechariah. "In summing up and comparing these several prophecies, the first conclusion that we are I think irresistibly led to respecting them, is that one and all refer to that same great crisis of the consummation: - that which is to be marked by the apostate nations' last conflict against God's cause and people; and to end in the Jubilean blessedness of a regenerated world." Elliott skillfully showed that seemingly diverse prophecies were all woven into Revelation, except for two themes of Ezekiel which were, perhaps significantly, left out. One is the idea that the wicked will be mutually destructive, the other that there will be a real chance some of the scoffers will repent. According to Edward Elliott's view, the millennium will be literal and the descent of the new Jerusalem will be pre-millennial, too. The millennium will be a time of bliss reserved for the martyrs and for those who refused the mark of the Beast. It is a forerunner of the new heaven and earth all the elect will enjoy after the second resurrection.
