= Events of Revelation =

Events that occur in the Book of Revelation

The events of Revelation are those described in the Book of Revelation, the final book of the New Testament. Revelation was a letter written by John to seven Christian churches, warning of the "Last Judgement" of the world: an apocalypse when "God's Kingdom," the New Jerusalem, will descend upon the earth, "coming down out of heaven from God, prepared as a bride adorned for her husband," and all Christians will be reborn, while nonbelievers will descend to Hell.

== Chapters ==
=== One ===
- The Revelation of Jesus Christ is given to John.

=== Two ===
- John urges the church of Ephesus to repent for having abandoned its first love, or the love they once had.
- John warns the church in Smyrna of ten days of tribulation that may bring imprisonment or death.
- John urges the church of Pergamum to repent of following the teachings of Balaam and the Nicolaitans.
- John addresses the church of Thyatira to repent from the teachings of the prophetess Jezebel.

=== Three ===
- John addresses the church of Sardis for being "dead" or unaware of things to come, whose works are not perfect before God.
- John addresses the church of Philadelphia to persevere with what little strength they have, to hold fast so that no one takes their crown.
- John addresses the church of Laodicea to repent from investing in material riches that make them miserable; rather, invest in the refined gold of Him who has overcome.

=== Four ===
- The heavenly throne with a rainbow around it, having "the 'One'" seated in it, is revealed.
- Twenty-four surrounding thrones seated with twenty-four crowned elders appear.
- The four living creatures present themselves; each having six wings full of eyes, one having the face of a lion, another as a calf, the third as a man, and the last as an eagle.

The first vision that the author experiences is that of entering Heaven and seeing God's throne (Revelation 4:1–6). In Revelation, God is described as "having the appearance like that of jasper and carnelian with a rainbow-like halo as brilliant as emerald". Around God's throne are twenty-four other thrones, on which sit elders in white robes. From the throne comes thunder and lightning and, in front of the throne, the author sees seven torches and a sea of crystal.

The author then sees four creatures, each having six wings covered in eyes (Revelation 4:6–11). The creatures are giving eternal thanks to God and, whenever one of them bows down to worship God, the Twenty-Four Elders around God's throne bow down to worship God.

This is a call back to Ezekiel 1:6- 14, in which Ezekiel had a similar vision.

=== Five ===
- A book/scroll secured by seven seals is revealed in the right hand of Him/the One (God) who sits on the throne(Revelation 5:1).
- It is made known that only "The Lion that is from the Tribe of Judah" (Revelation 5:5) is worthy to open this book/scroll.
- The Lamb, with seven horns and seven eyes, takes the book/scroll from Him who sits on the throne (Revelation 5:6–7).
- All heavenly beings sing praise and honor The Lamb (Revelation 5:9).

=== Six ===
- The first seal is broken and the first of the four living creatures introduces a white horse whose rider, given a crown and a bow, goes out to conquer.
- The second seal is broken and the second of the four living creatures introduces a red horse, whose rider, wielding a great sword, goes out to take peace from the earth. War.
- The third seal is broken and the third of the four living creatures introduces a black horse, whose rider carries a pair of scales, which represent famine.
- The fourth seal is broken and the fourth of the four living creatures introduces a pale horse, whose rider has the name Death and Hades follows him. He is given authority to kill with wars and famine and disease and wild animals.
- The fifth seal is broken revealing the souls of those who had been slain for the "Word of God".
- The sixth seal is broken "and there was a great earthquake; and the sun became black as sackcloth made of hair, and the whole moon became like blood; and the stars of the sky fell to the earth. The sky was split apart, every mountain and island was moved out of their places."
- Mankind hides themselves in the caves and mountains acknowledging the presence of Him who sits on the throne and the wrath of the Lamb.

=== Seven ===
- The servants of God are revealed, those who are to be sealed before the destruction of the Earth.
- The number of these servants is given as one hundred and forty-four thousand who are from twelve tribes of Israel.
- Twelve thousand from each tribe are sealed: from Judah, Reuben, Gad, Asher, Naphtali, Manasseh, Simeon, Levi, Issachar, Zebulun, Joseph, and Benjamin.
- A great multitude who came out of the Great Tribulation present themselves in white robes, with palm branches in their hands.

=== Eight ===
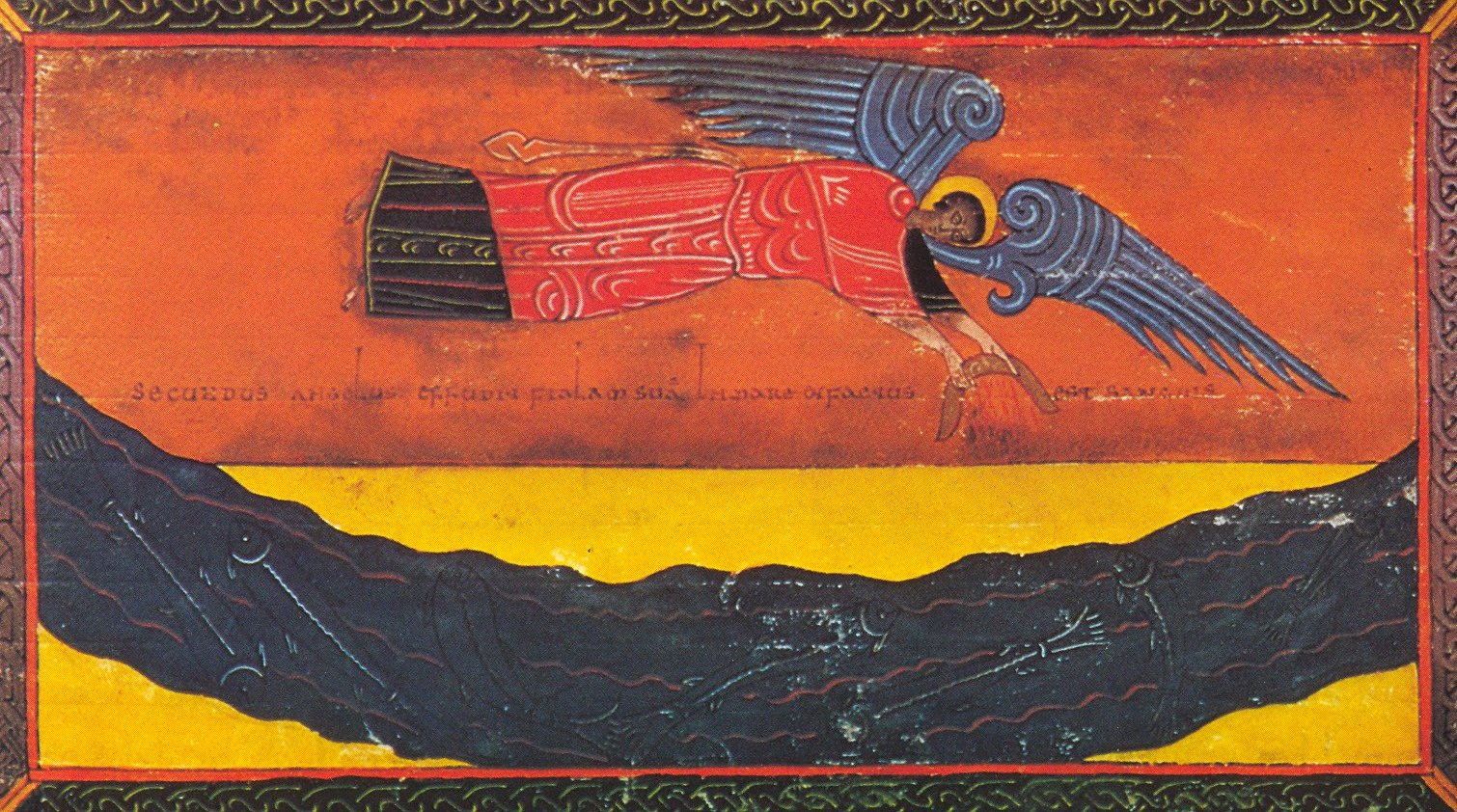
Fifth trumpet: Woe! Beatus de Facundus, 1047.

- The seventh seal is opened and heaven is silent for about half an hour.
- An angel offers incense and the prayers of all the saints, at the golden altar before the throne.
- After the smoke and the prayers ascend to God, the angel fills the censer with fire, from the altar, and throws it to the Earth causing noises, thunderings, lightnings, and an earthquake.
- The first angel of seven sounded his trumpet: "And hail and fire followed, mingled with blood, and they were thrown to the earth" burning a third of the Earth's flora, scorching all green grass.
- The second angel sounded his trumpet: "And something like a great mountain burning with fire was thrown in the sea, and a third of the sea became blood" killing a third of everything in the ocean, including ships.
- The third angel sounded: And a great star, named "Wormwood", fell from heaven poisoning the water from rivers and water springs.
- The fourth angel sounded: The sun, the moon and stars are struck, so that a third of their light diminished to the point of complete darkness for a third of a day, even during the night.
- Another angel appears to declare three "Woes" for the next three trumpet blasts.

=== Nine ===
- The fifth angel sounds his trumpet: this signals the "First woe".
- A star falls from heaven to the earth and is given the key to the bottomless pit.
- It opens the pit and smoke rises, darkening the air and sunlight.
- The Locusts come out of the smoke, from the pit, and Abaddon commands them to torment any man who does not have the seal of God on his forehead for five months.
- The sixth angel sounds his trumpet
- The four angels who are bound at the great river Euphrates are released.
- The four angels of the Euphrates raise an army of 200 million cavalry who kill a third of mankind.

=== Ten ===
- Another mighty angel (the seventh) appears standing with one foot on the sea and the other on land, holding an opened little book.
- The angel cries out and seven thunders utter their voices.
- The apostle John is commanded to seal up what the thunders uttered in the little book, and is told not to write about what was said.
- The angel declares that the revealing of the mystery of God would be finished with the sounding of the seventh trumpet.
- John is instructed to take the little book and to eat it.

=== Eleven ===
- John is given a measuring rod to measure the temple of God, the altar, and those who worship in it.
- It is brought to John's attention that the nations will tread under foot, the holy city of the temple, for forty-two months (1,260 days).
- During that same time, two witnesses, dressed in sackcloth, will prophesy and this torments the nations.
- The first mention of the Beast is told to John, who will overcome the two witnesses and kill them.
- For three and a half days, the people of the earth will celebrate the death of the two witnesses who've tormented them for three and half years.
- God will resurrect the two witnesses; this strikes fear on everyone witnessing their revival, and the two witnesses ascend to heaven.
- In the next hour, a great earthquake occurs and kills seven thousand people, destroying a tenth of the city.
- The "Third woe" is signaled by the sound of the seventh trumpet.
- Loud voices in heaven proclaim Christ as ruler forever under the "Kingdom of our Lord".
- Thanks is given to God, the Almighty and praise for the wrath that came, the dead who were judged, and the bond-servants rewarded.
- The temple of God in heaven opens and the Ark of the Covenant appears in His temple.
- Lightning and the peals of thunder occur followed by an earthquake and a great hailstorm.

=== Twelve ===
==== War in Heaven ====
War breaks out in Heaven.

Historicist view
In the traditional historicist view, Joseph Mede (1627) identified the war of Michael the Archangel and the Dragon as the fall of Paganism by Christianity. This concept was adopted by Campegius Vitringa (1705), Dr. Charles Daubuz (1720), Bishop Newton, John Cunninghame, and Edward Bishop Elliott (1837). Jacques-Bénigne Bossuet (17th century), even marks the fall of Paganism to the death of Galerius Maximus in the year 311.

==== Woman ====
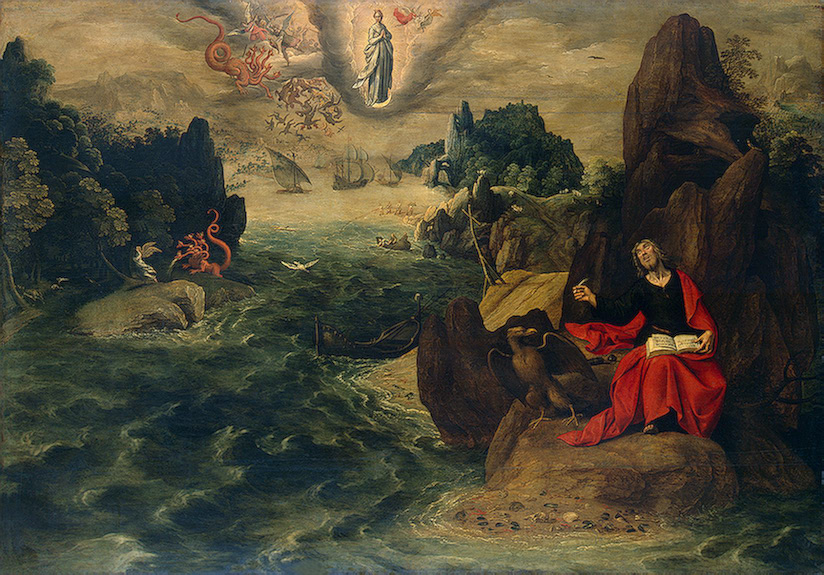
Landscape with St John the Evangelist at Patmos by Tobias Verhaecht, 1598. The woman and the dragon are shown in the sky.

A woman gives birth to a son who is to "rule the nations with an iron scepter". She is then pursued by a Dragon with seven heads and ten horns, which wants to kill her baby. However, the child was taken away by God. Immediately after this, Michael and his angels fought the Dragon and his followers in Heaven. The Dragon lost the war, and was thrown down to Earth along with all of its followers. The Dragon pursued the woman and tried to drown her, but the water drained away into the ground. The woman grew wings and flew away. The Dragon was enraged, and went to war with the remainder of her offspring, who keep the commandments of God.

=== Thirteen ===
A beast with ten horns atop seven heads rises out of the sea and is given authority to rule the Earth by the Dragon. The people of Earth marvel at the beast's abilities and worship it and the Dragon. (Revelation 13:4). The beast is able to control the entire planet, and goes to war against the saints. Following this, another beast arises, this time from the ground. This beast, which resembles a lamb but speaks like a dragon, exercises authority on behalf of the previous, and causes "great and miraculous signs" by which to make people follow the original beast. The second beast, also known as the false prophet, forces all to receive the Mark of the Beast on their right hand or forehead, declaring that "no one could buy or sell unless he had the mark, which is the name of the beast or the number of his name." (Revelation 13:11–17).

=== Fourteen ===
- The Lamb appears on Mount Zion with 144,000 blameless male virgins as first fruits, who sing a new song and follow the Lamb.
- An angel appears in midair proclaiming the gospel.
- A second angel announces Babylon's fall.
- A third angel declares God's wrath on those who worship or receive the mark of the beast. This requires endurance by the faithful.
- A heavenly voice pronounces the blessedness and reward of the dead "in the Lord"(Revelation 14:13).
- An angel invites a crowned "son of man", seated on a cloud, to use his sickle to harvest the earth.
- Another angel, tending an altar fire, invites yet another angel to harvest the earth's ripe grapes, at which he does so. Huge volumes of blood are produced from trampling these within a wine press.

=== Fifteen ===
John writes of seven angels with seven plagues, the last plagues ever to occur. He states that until the plagues are complete, no one can enter the Temple of God.

=== Sixteen ===
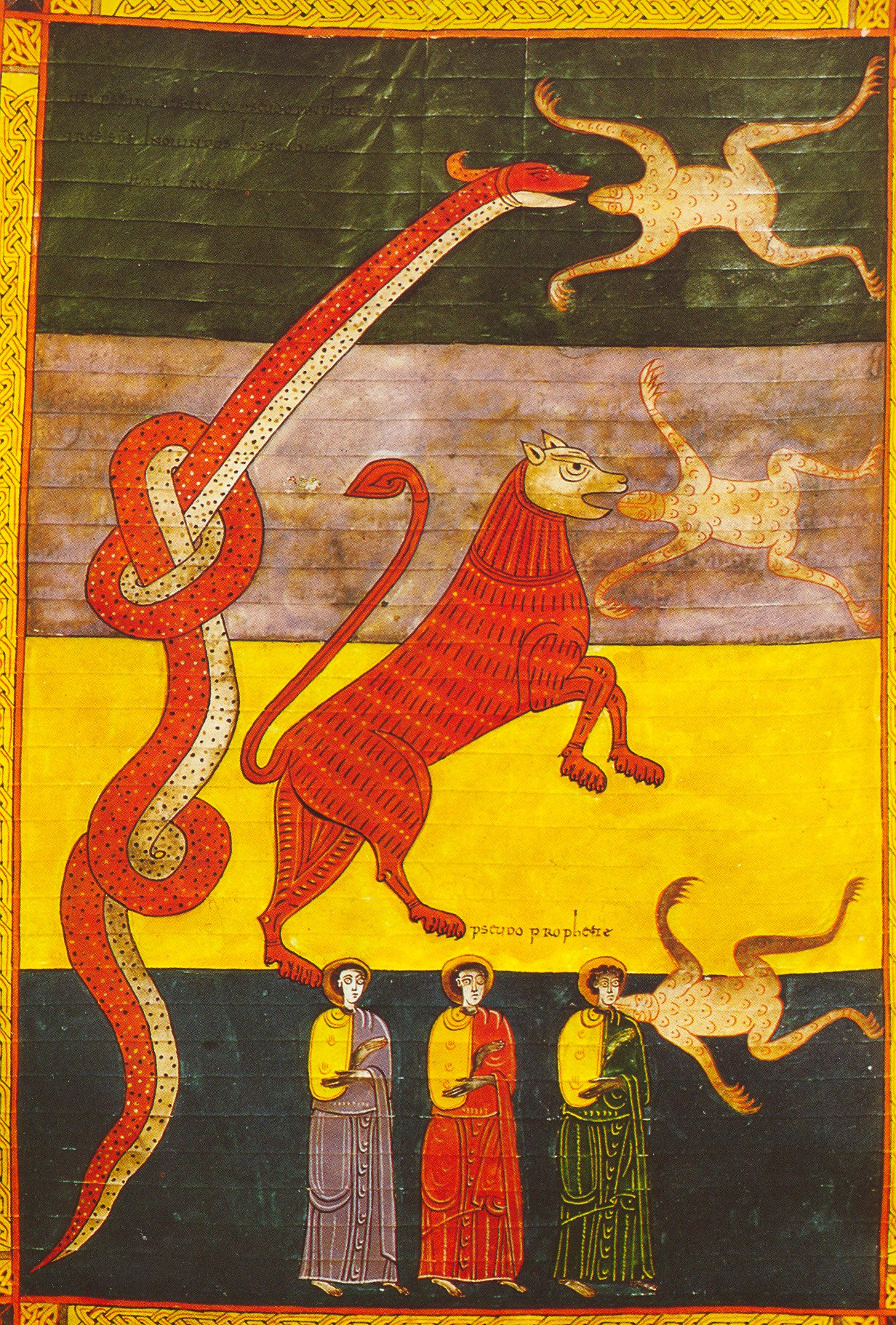
The False Prophet, Apoc. XVI, Beatus de Facundus.

The seven Vial/Bowl judgments are similar in nature to the Trumpet judgments, but far more serious for there will be no warning when they come. In addition, there are three key differences between the Trumpet judgments and the Vial/Bowl judgments: firstly, the Trumpet judgments are plagues that bring partial devastation and plagues upon 1/3 of nature and people, while the Vial/Bowl judgments are more severe direct assaults against humanity and nature, thus bringing more chaos on the earth than the Trumpet judgments. Lastly, the Trumpet judgments offer a possibility of redemption and repentance, while the Vial judgments do not: the Vial judgments are a literal assault on those who have taken the mark of the Beast, and to those who are considered incorrigibles and arrogantly unrepentant, thus making them impossible to save. The Vial/Bowl judgments are listed below.

- Noisome and grievous sores (possibly boils or carbuncles) on the worshipers of the Beast. These sores only affect those bearing the Mark of the Beast and the people who worship his image.
- Sea turns to blood wiping out all life in the sea.
- Rivers and Springs turn to blood.
- A major heatwave causes the Sun to burn with intense heat and to scorch people with fire. (Revelation 16:8–9)
- The kingdom of the beast is plunged into darkness. (Revelation 16:11)
- The Euphrates River dries up to facilitate the crossing of the armies from the east, on their way to Israel for the battle of Armageddon. This event corresponds with Daniel 11:44.
- Worldwide earthquake levelling every mountain into the sea followed by huge hailstones and lightning. The Earth's geography and topography will be drastically altered forever, as every mountain and hill will be levelled, and every island will either be removed from its foundations or disappear. The earthquakes are accompanied by 100-lb hailstones.

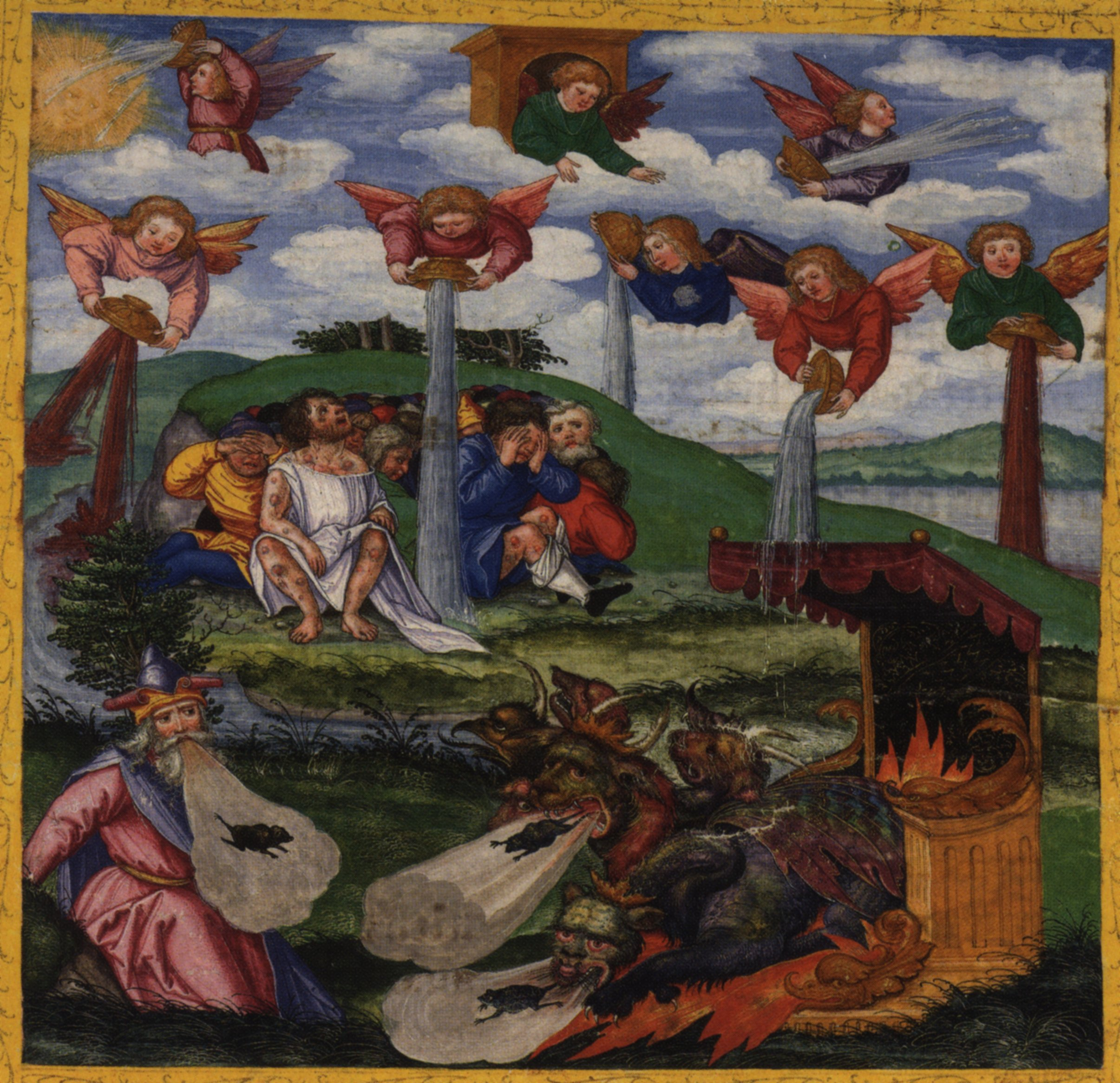
The seven bowls of wrath. Ottheinrich-bible, c. 1531 AD.

Some Christians believe that the seals and trumpets will occur during the first half of the tribulation. The vial judgments will occur during the second half, as the first judgment refers to those with the mark of the beast. The mark will not be implemented until the Antichrist appears to be dead after suffering a fatal wound, only to be miraculously healed by Satan, and after he defiles the Temple; and this will happen precisely at the midpoint of the tribulation. Thus, the vial judgments will be more severe.

Others, such as a number of historicists, argue that the seals generally cover man's history from after the first coming of Christ up to the End time, with the trumpets generally covering the Tribulation, and the Bowls reserved for the Wrath of God period — preceding the Millennium.

=== Seventeen ===
The woman who rides on the beast is introduced in the seventeenth chapter. The entire chapter is quite symbolic, but an angel explains to John the meaning of what he is seeing. The woman, who is referred to as "the great prostitute", "is the great city who rules over the kings of the earth" (Revelation 17:18), who is envied by the ten kings who give power to the beast and is destroyed by those ten kings. "They will bring her to ruin and leave her naked; they will eat her flesh and burn her with fire. For God has put it into their hearts to accomplish his purpose by agreeing to give the beast their power to rule, until God's words are fulfilled" (Revelation 17:16–17).

Revelation 17–18 introduces a Woman dressed in purple and scarlet, and decked with gold, precious stones and pearls. She sits on a scarlet beast with 7 heads (representing 7 mountains and 7 kings)(Revelation 17:9–10) and 10 horns (representing 10 kings who have not received a kingdom, while still having king-like authority).(Revelation 17:12–13) She is described as the "Mother of Harlots" and is drunk with the blood of the saints indicating her intense involvement in persecution. She comes to power and rules the kings and peoples of the earth. Eventually, the 10 kings ruling the kingdoms that give their power to the Beast grow tired of her influence and overthrow her. Her destruction will cause the kings and merchants of the earth to mourn her death.

=== Eighteen ===
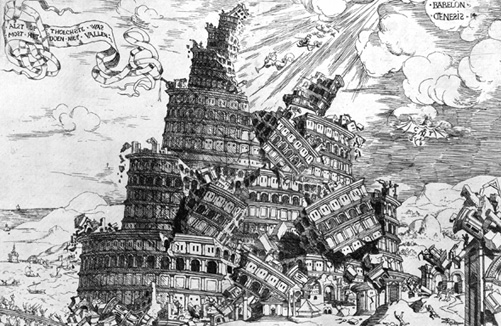
Fall of the Tower of Babel. Cornelis Anthonisz, 1547

Babylon falls. This causes the merchants of the earth to weep because no one is able to buy their products anymore.

=== Nineteen ===
The marriage between Jesus and his bride, who has prepared herself and clothed in white linen, occurs (Revelation 19:5–10).

A "white horse, whose rider is called Faithful and True" is introduced. "With Justice he makes war" (Revelation 19:11). Jesus Christ is the rider mentioned in chapter twelve. John references Psalm 2:9 when he writes "He will rule them with an iron scepter" (Revelation 19:15). This is when the first war between the people of God and the rest of the world takes place. After the war has finished the beast and the false prophet are taken captives and thrown into the lake of fire, while all other enemy combatants are killed and their corpses left out on the field for the birds of the sky to devour their flesh (Revelation 19:20–21).

Jesus returns to earth followed by the armies of Heaven, which are seen riding white horses dressed in fine linen. The Beast and his False Prophet make war with the armies of Christ but are defeated. In the aftermath of their defeat, the Antichrist and False Prophet are cast alive into the Lake of Fire, which burns forever.

=== Twenty ===
Satan is bound in the Abyss for a thousand years. The Saints who died are resurrected (Resurrection of the Saints) and begin their thousand-year reign with Christ (Revelation 20:1–6). After the thousand years, Satan is released from the Abyss to deceive the nations and gather Gog and Magog and the people of the world to encircle the camp of the saints and the city of Jerusalem. A fire comes down from God out of heaven and devours them and Satan is finally placed in torment, in the Lake of Fire, forever, with those who follow him (Revelation 20:7–10). The wicked dead and all of those who died during the thousand-year reign of Christ are resurrected and judged (Revelation 20:11–14).

=== Twenty-one ===
A new heaven and a new earth with the New Jerusalem (the World to Come) replace the old heaven and earth (Revelation 21:1). This is a reference to Genesis 1:1 and Isaiah 65:17. Some theologians interpret it allegorically as explaining the drastic difference in this world and 'heaven' when Christ has been acknowledged as having returned. "He will wipe away every tear from their eyes. There will be no more death or mourning or crying or pain, for the old order of things has passed away." (Revelation 21:4).

=== Twenty-two ===
A description of the heavenly state, under the figures of the water of life and the tree of life, and of the throne of God and the Lamb. (Revelation 22:1–5) The truth and certain fulfilling of all the prophetic visions, The Holy Spirit and the wife/bride of the Lamb, invite, and say, "Come". (Revelation 22:6–19) The closing blessing. (Revelation 22:20,21).
