= St Mark's Church, Brighton =

St Mark's Church
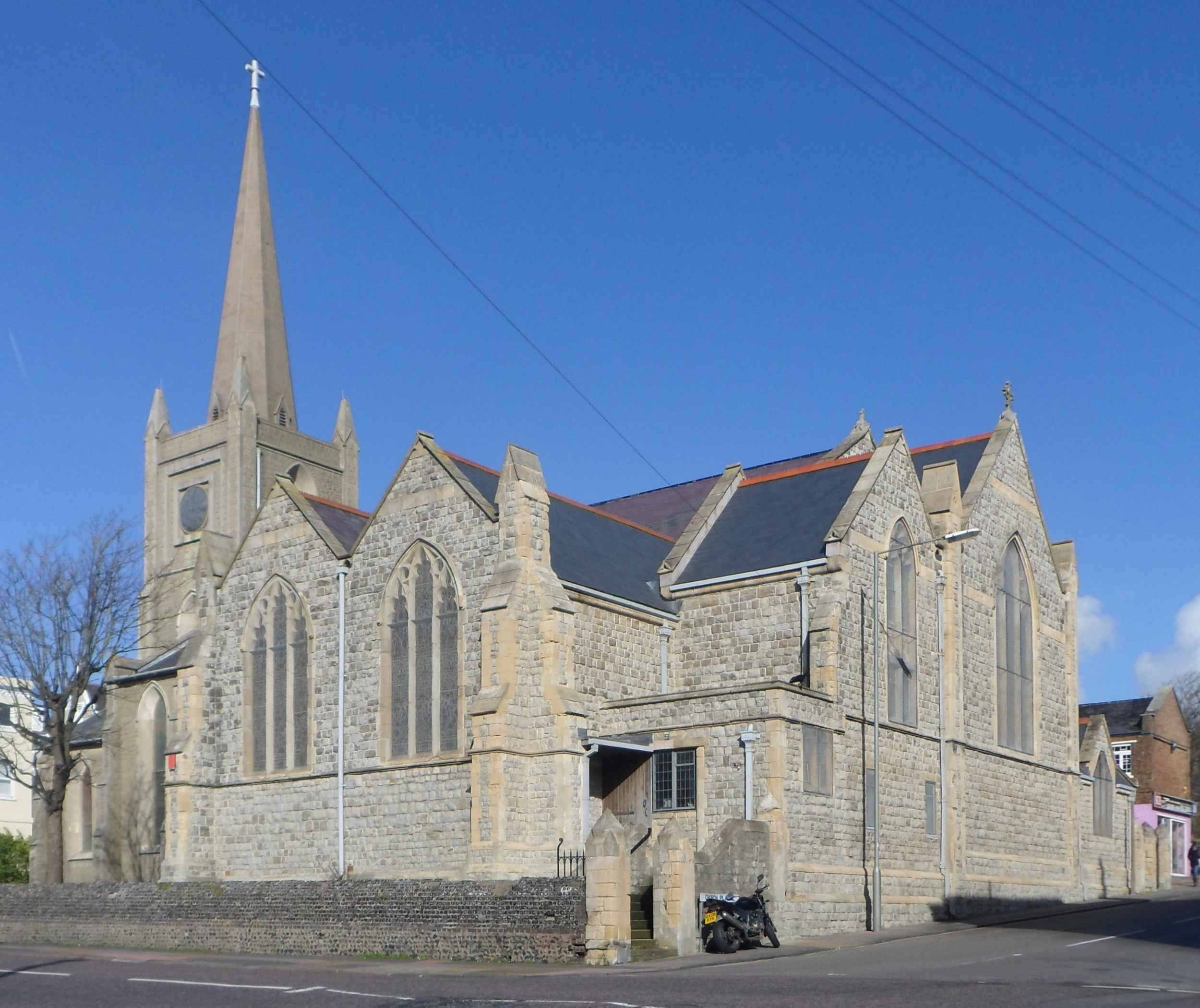
- The church from the southeast
- St Mark's Church
- 50.8176°N 0.1120°W
- Location: Eastern Road/Church Place, Kemptown, Brighton and Hove BN2 5JF
- Country: England
- Denomination: Anglican

History
- Status: Church
- Founded: 1838
- Founder: Frederick Hervey, 1st Marquess of Bristol
- Dedication: Mark the Evangelist
- Consecrated: 21 September 1849

Architecture
- Functional status: Chapel & Arts Centre of St Mary’s Hall School
- Heritage designation: Grade II listed
- Designated: 26 August 1999
- Architect(s): Unattributed; possibly George Cheesman Jr., Thomas Cooper or Thomas Shelbourne; additions by W. Gilbert Scott
- Style: Early English Gothic Revival
- Groundbreaking: 1838
- Completed: 1849
- Construction cost: £4,800
- Closed: 29 April 1986

Specifications
- Materials: Stone, ashlar, concrete

St Mark's Church is a former Anglican church in the Kemptown area of Brighton, part of the English city of Brighton and Hove. Originally intended as the private chapel of the adjacent St Mary's Hall school, it was partly built in 1838 at the request of Frederick Hervey, 1st Marquess of Bristol; but arguments over whether or not it should also be open to the public delayed its completion for more than 10 years. It became the parish church of Kemptown in 1873, but declining attendances resulted in a declaration of redundancy in 1986. At that time it was taken over by the school and became its chapel, nearly 150 years after this was first proposed. The Early English-style stone and concrete structure has been criticised by architectural historians, but has been listed at Grade II by English Heritage for its architectural and historical importance.

== History ==
Brighton's rapid growth in the early decades of the 19th century resulted in residential development filling in the gap on the cliffs between Thomas Read Kemp's high-class Kemp Town estate and the longer-established area around the Royal Pavilion and Old Steine, the centre of high society activity in the late 18th century. Roads such as Eastern Road and Bristol Road ran from west to east towards Kemp Town, and high-density housing branched off on roads to the north and south. This area became known as Kemptown [sic]. Kemp owned much of the land in the area, but in the 1820s he sold about 150 acres (61 ha) to Frederick Hervey, 1st Marquess of Bristol. He had succeeded to the Earldom of Bristol when his father, the 4th Earl of Bristol (known as the Earl-Bishop), died in 1803. The Marquess, who assumed that title in 1826, was interested in church-building and works of charity. Soon after buying the land, he gave a portion to Reverend Henry Venn Elliott to allow him to build St Mary's Hall School. In 1837, Reverend Elliott began to plan for an Anglican church to serve the area, and the Marquess gave more land next to the school to allow one to be built there. Construction started in 1838, and the Marquess spent about £2,000 (£192,000 in 2025) to ensure a rapid completion. However, disagreements soon arose over these plans: the Diocese of Chichester had not approved the proposal to open the church to the public, and had only given permission for the building to be a private chapel for the school; and the Vicar of Brighton, Reverend Henry Michell Wagner, disapproved of its location—it was considered to be too close to St George's Church. Correspondence and debate carried on for several years between the men involved, and an independent party—the Commissioners for Building New Churches—eventually had to take charge of the project.

Construction was allowed to continue in 1848, after agreement was reached that the church could be used for public worship, and the Bishop of Chichester Ashurst Turner Gilbert conducted a consecration ceremony on 21 September 1849. The identity of the architect was not recorded, but sources suggest either George Cheesman Jr.—whose Christ Church in Montpelier Road, Brighton was very similar—or Thomas Cooper. Thomas Shelbourne was the builder; he may have had some influence in the design as well. The final cost was £4,800 (£527,000 in 2025), most of which was contributed by the Marquess and Reverend Elliott.

The church had a capacity of more than 1,000, and about half of the pews were free (not subject to pew rents). The others provided income to offset church expenditure until the pew rent system was abolished in 1930. Reverend Henry Venn Elliott's brother, Reverend Edward Bishop Elliott, became the vicar in 1853 and remained in charge until his death in 1875. Although he was buried at St Andrew's Church in Hove, a memorial stone was installed in the chancel. It is next to a tablet commemorating the Marquess of Bristol, who had died in 1859. The congregation and others also donated money to fund a new window in the east end as a memorial to him.

In 1848, three bells were installed by Mears & Stainbank (now the Whitechapel Bell Foundry) of London, and three more were added in 1867 when the tower was given the clock which it was intended to have had from the beginning. A vicarage was added in 1888 after the 3rd Marquess of Bristol donated land from his estate, and larger-scale alterations took place between 1891 and 1892, when the new vicar commissioned architect W. Gilbee Scott to add a chancel, vestry, south transept and organ chamber and to alter the galleries. A north transept was never built, although it was planned. The new chancel was altered further by the addition of multicoloured paintwork and a marble reredos in 1913, during the short incumbency of Reverend Henry Venn Elliott's grandson, also called Henry Venn Elliott. The 3rd Marquess of Bristol paid for this work.

In 1873, St Mark's became the parish church of Kemptown; St George's Church had originally held this status. By the 1980s, however, attendances were falling, and the Diocese of Chichester declared the church redundant as from 1 May 1986. Its parish was merged into that of St George's Church, which also gained the area covered by the parish of St Anne's Church, closed and demolished in 1986. The official name of this parish is now "St George with St Anne and St Mark". The building was then given to St Mary's Hall School for use as their private chapel, arts centre and concert hall. This meant that after nearly 150 years, it was being used for the purpose for which it was originally built.

== Architecture ==
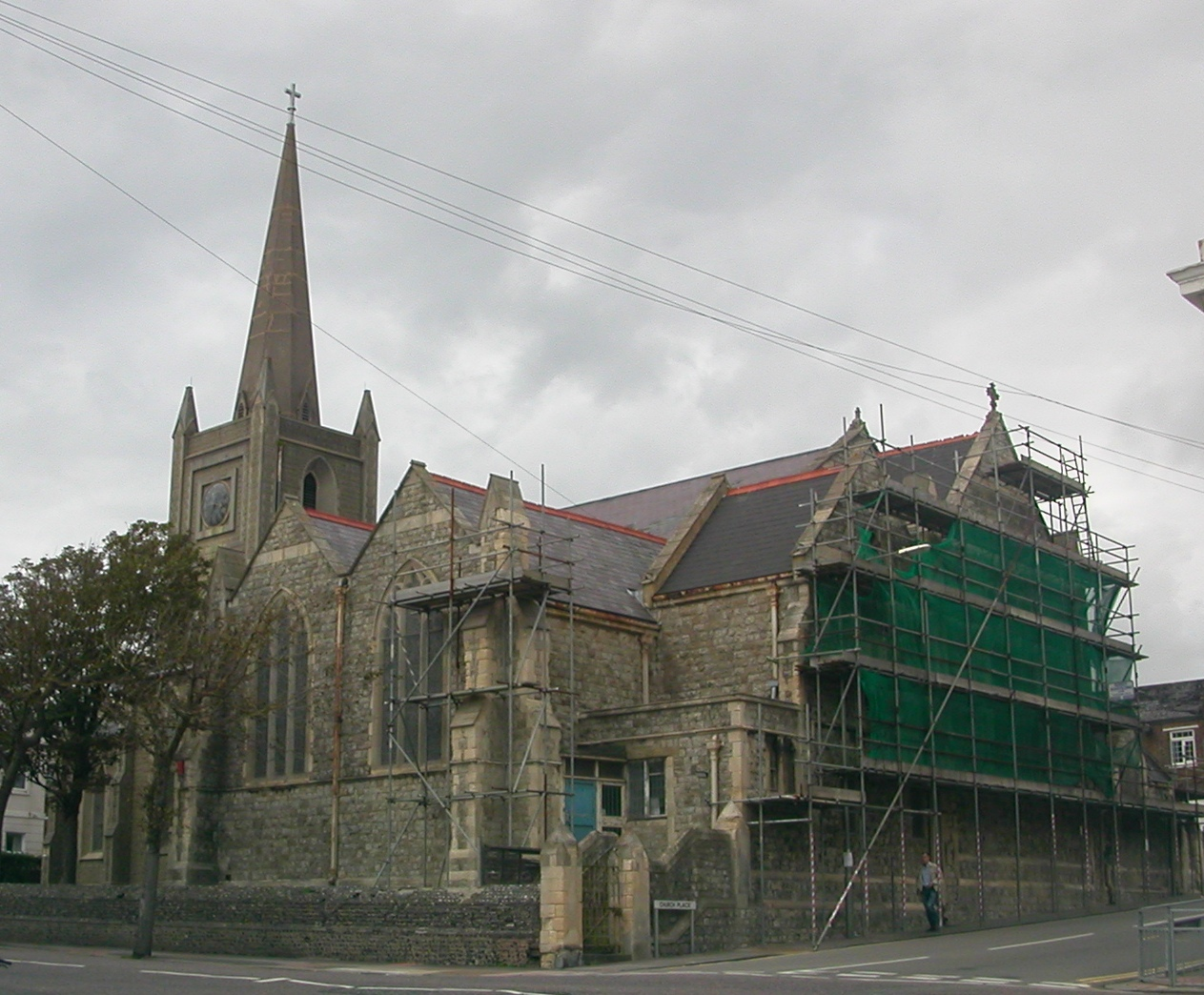
The east end undergoing restoration in 2008

Prominent architectural historians have criticised St Mark's Church. Nikolaus Pevsner wrote of its "terrible stone facing", while Harry Stuart Goodhart-Rendel considered both St Mark's and the very similar Christ Church (now demolished) to have "deplorable architecture [...] combining the smugness of the chapel [with] the peculiarity of the Gothic". The building does not reflect ecclesiastical architectural norms of the mid-19th century, partly because its construction started several years earlier and also because Reverend Elliott and the Marquess of Bristol held traditionalist, old-fashioned views.

The church was built in the Early English Gothic Revival style using a combination of concrete, stone and ashlar. The concrete was used to imitate Kentish Ragstone; the north side is stuccoed to resemble ashlar; and genuine ashlar was used for the late 19th-century extensions. The concrete section has stone quoins at the corners. The south façade, facing Eastern Road, has lancet windows and small buttresses, and the north face is identical. The tower, topped with a spire, stands at the west end and also has lancets and corner buttresses; it is flanked by porches. All roofs are of slate.

As originally designed, the nave and its adjacent aisles consisted of one open-plan area demarcated by narrow cast iron columns and piers. A stone chancel arch led to W. Gilbee Scott's chancel, with one bay and a window with tracery work. The vestry was on the north side of the chancel, opposite the organ chamber. The galleries, altered and mostly removed during the 1891–1892 work, originally ran round three sides of the interior and were held up by fluted columns.

== The church today ==
St Mark's Church was listed at Grade II by English Heritage on 26 August 1999. It is one of 1,124 Grade II-listed buildings and structures, and 1,218 listed buildings of all grades, in the city of Brighton and Hove.

St Mary's Hall School now owns the church. Reverend Henry Venn Elliott founded the school, which opened on 1 August 1836, and commissioned George Basevi to design it. He used the Early Tudor style, and the building cost £4,250 (£420,000 in 2025), over half of which was paid by Reverend Elliott. Many extensions have been built subsequently. The school made some internal alterations to the church to allow part of it to be used as an arts centre and concert hall, but its main function is still religious. More extensive alterations are planned, for which planning permission has been granted; the arts centre area is to be extended and opened to groups from outside the school.

== See also ==
- Grade II listed buildings in Brighton and Hove: S
- List of places of worship in Brighton and Hove
- Media related to St Mark's Church, Brighton at Wikimedia Commons

== Notes ==
=== Bibliography ===
- Brighton Polytechnic. School of Architecture and Interior Design (1987). A Guide to the Buildings of Brighton. Macclesfield: McMillan Martin. ISBN 1-869865-03-0.
- Carder, Timothy (1990). The Encyclopaedia of Brighton. Lewes: East Sussex County Libraries. ISBN 0-86147-315-9.
- Dale, Antony (1989). Brighton Churches. London: Routledge. ISBN 0-415-00863-8.
- Elleray, D. Robert (2004). Sussex Places of Worship. Worthing: Optimus Books. ISBN 0-9533132-7-1.
- Gilbert, Edmund M. (1954). Brighton: Old Ocean's Bauble. Hassocks: Flare Books. ISBN 0-901759-39-2.
- Nairn, Ian; Pevsner, Nikolaus (1965). The Buildings of England: Sussex. Harmondsworth: Penguin Books. ISBN 0-14-071028-0.
