= Sir Richard Steele, 1st Baronet =

Irish politician

Sir Richard Steele, 1st Baronet of Hampstead, Co.Dublin, was an MP in the Parliament of Ireland, for Mullingar, in Co. Westmeath, serving from 1765 until 1776. He was the second son of Robert Steele of Summercove, Co. Cork (believed a descendant of Richard Steele of Sandbach; grandson of Laurence Steele - Clerk to the Irish House of Commons of Rathbride Co. Kildare, (the brother of William Steele MP, Lord Chancellor of Ireland 1656) and kinsman of Sir Richard Steele the essayist). He was made the 1st Baronet Steele of Hampstead, Co Dublin. in 1768. He married 13 February 1731 Dorothea daughter of Francis Armstead, he married secondly Margaret daughter of Robert Smith of Gibleston, Scotland. He had had four sons and three daughters. Richard Steele had settled in North Co. Dublin, at Hampstead, Glasnevin, buying the estate from Charles Davys in 1775, He lived in Dominick Street and later (1755) built 11 Parnell Square, 1770 LLD Dublin University. On his death, on 20 February 1785, he bequeathed his Hampstead estate to his second son Steele Smith who was Sheriff of Dublin. Hampstead Park/Albert College Park, and Hampstead are now on the land of his former estate and he was succeeded by his son Sir Parker Steele born 1743 who had served under Frederick the Great throughout the Seven Years' War and later served in America, 1763 ADC to the Viceroy. He married on 4 December 1773 Maria daughter of John Verity of Rooley Hall, Bowling, Yorkshire, following his death his widow lived at 11 Merrion Square, Dublin where on Christmas Eve 1797 in Lady Steele's drawing room, Christina, Lady Longford sets her 1942 play 'The United Brothers'(John and Henry Sheares). He was succeeded by his son Sir Richard Steele, 3rd Bt.

Baronetage of Ireland
New creation	Baronet (of Hampstead); 1768–1785	Succeeded by Parker Steele
