= Canadian Society of Biblical Studies =

Learned society established in 1933

The Canadian Society of Biblical Studies (CSBS) is a Canadian learned society established in 1933 to support teaching and research relating to biblical studies. It is the oldest humanities-related academic society in Canada. Among those involved in its foundation were R. B. Y. Scott, C.V. Pilcher, John Lowe, and its first President Sir Robert Falconer. Among its subsequent Presidents have been E.R. Fairweather, Norman Wagner, and Peter C. Craigie.
