= Maria Pearson (murderer) =

UK's longest-serving female prisoner

- Born: 12 March 1956 (age 70); Hartlepool, England
- Other names: The UK's forgotten inmate, the forgotten prisoner
- Spouse: Malcolm Pearson (separated)
- Children: 3
- Status: Imprisoned as of 2023
- Criminal charge: Murder
- Penalty: Life imprisonment with a minimum tariff of 11 years' imprisonment

Maria Pearson (born 12 March 1956), also known as the "UK's forgotten inmate" or the "forgotten prisoner", is a British convicted murderer who is notable for being the United Kingdom's longest-serving female prisoner. Having bigamously married a man in 1986 after two previous marriages, she had a violent relationship with him and separated after one month, only to become infuriated and jealous when the man met a new girlfriend. Aged 31, she decided to stalk the 23-year-old woman, abusing her and sending threatening letters to her mother. Subsequently, she stabbed the young woman 17 times in the street and killed her, stabbing her twice through the heart. In July 1987, she received a life sentence, with a minimum tariff of 12 years.

As of 2023, she has been denied parole nine times. She has mostly refused to take part in rehabilitation programmes in prison, and has twice been sent back from open prisons due to repeated poor behaviour such as bullying and intimidation. She has refused to acknowledge her guilt and attempted to appeal her conviction on the grounds that, although she did kill the woman, it was "an act of self-defence and provocation". She has had many attempts at overturning her conviction, all of which – including her attempts to appeal to the independent miscarriage of justice watchdog the Criminal Cases Review Commission – have failed. Her most recent parole rejection occurred in February 2023. At this time, she was noted for having served only one year less than infamous female UK murderer Myra Hindley, who was never released from prison.

Pearson was released and subsequently recalled in August 2026 after breaching the conditions of her licence.

== Murder ==
Maria Pearson, from Hartlepool, had been married twice before and had two children. In February 1986, she bigamously married for a third time, to Malcolm Pearson; shortly after, they had a child together, Maria's third. Their marriage failed, with their relationship being described as "stormy and violent", and they separated after one month. Despite this, Pearson soon became, as her judge later described, "deeply hostile and resentful" when Malcolm Pearson began a new relationship with 23-year-old Janet Newton, with Pearson full of "jealousy and bitterness" towards this new love rival. Pearson spent a period of time stalking Newton through the streets, shouting abuse at her and sending her mother hate mail, before, on 18 October 1986, stabbing her seventeen times with a sheath knife in Grange Road, Hartlepool, including twice through the heart. The killing was so horrific that police thought that it was a vehicle hit-and-run when they first arrived on the scene.

== Imprisonment ==
Pearson was jailed for the murder of Newton in July 1987. Pearson immediately attempted to appeal the conviction in 1988, claiming she was not guilty because of her "mental and physical state of mind". She then changed her story and admitted killing Newton, but only as "an act of self-defence and provocation", and claimed in her appeal that she should not be held responsible because she had post-natal depression and pre-menstrual tension. The appeal was dismissed. She appealed to the courts six times until 1998, when the final one was rejected. She then appealed to the Criminal Cases Review Commission, the independent miscarriages of justice watchdog, but this was also rejected. When this was declined, she attempted to further appeal this decision.

Pearson was initially moved to an open prison in preparation for release in 2004, but was quickly returned to a closed category prison after bullying and intimidation. A similar situation occurred in 2021. In 2006, when a judge rejected her complaints over her not being allowed to move to an open prison, he told her that she was still "in denial" and observed she showed little sympathy for the victim she had stabbed seventeen times. She has been reluctant to engage with professional services offered in prison. After taking part in a 2014 programme on improving decision-making, she openly admitted at her next parole hearing that she had told the organisers "what she thought they wanted to hear".

A number of parole attempts were rejected and in 2020 her eighth was refused, in part because she had continued to be a disruptive prisoner. After her ninth rejection in 2023, the Ministry of Justice said that its records showed she was the longest-serving female prisoner in the UK. Similarly to previous attempts, her 2023 parole application was rejected in part because of poor behaviour, including being "abusive and aggressive" to staff, and it was heard that she had been "willing to resort to violence" to solve her problems at the time of the murder.

The family of Malcolm Pearson protested against the possibility of her release in 2023, saying she should never be released as one cannot "rehabilitate psychos". Part of the proposed plan to release Pearson would have required her to live in appointed accommodation and have restrictions on her movements, actions and who she could contact, but Pearson refused to accept this.

== See also ==
- Sarah Panitzke – the UK's "most-wanted woman"
