= Sarah Panitzke =

British criminal and fraudster (born 1974)

- Born: Sarah Gina Panitzke; 3 March 1974 (age 52); Fulford, East Riding of Yorkshire, England
- Education: St Peter's School, York
- Occupation: Fraudster
- Parents: Leo Panitzke (father); Paula Panitzke (mother)
- Status: Imprisoned until at least 2027
- Criminal charges: Fraud, failure to pay a confiscation order
- Penalty: Eight years' imprisonment (for fraud); Nine years' imprisonment (for failure to pay confiscation order)

Sarah Gina Panitzke (born 3 March 1974) is a British criminal and fraudster who, until 2022, was widely described as "the UK's most wanted woman".

== Flight and imprisonment ==
A former private school girl at St Peter's School, York, and from an already-wealthy family, she fled Britain in 2013 while on trial for a £1-billion tax scam, and was for several years the only woman on the National Crime Agency's list of most-wanted fugitives. She was found guilty of the tax scam and sentenced to eight years' imprisonment in her absence.

In January 2022, she was tracked to a gated community in Vilanova i la Geltrú, Barcelona, Spain, where it was said she had been living a "life of luxury" under a false identity. She was arrested on 27 February 2022 while walking her dog in Santa Bàrbara, Tarragona, footage of which was later released. After being extradited back to Britain, she began her eight-year sentence and was told she would not be able to apply for parole for four years (half her sentence), and faced nine years of imprisonment for not paying back a £2.4 million confiscation order made in 2016. In March 2023, she was further found guilty of this and sentenced to an additional nine years' imprisonment, meaning she would not become eligible for parole until late 2027. Legally, she was not able to be punished for fleeing the country while on trial, and as of 2023, none of the money has been returned.

== See also ==
- Fiona Mont
