= St George's Church, Brighton =

Coordinates: 50°49′5.37″N 0°7′9.44″W

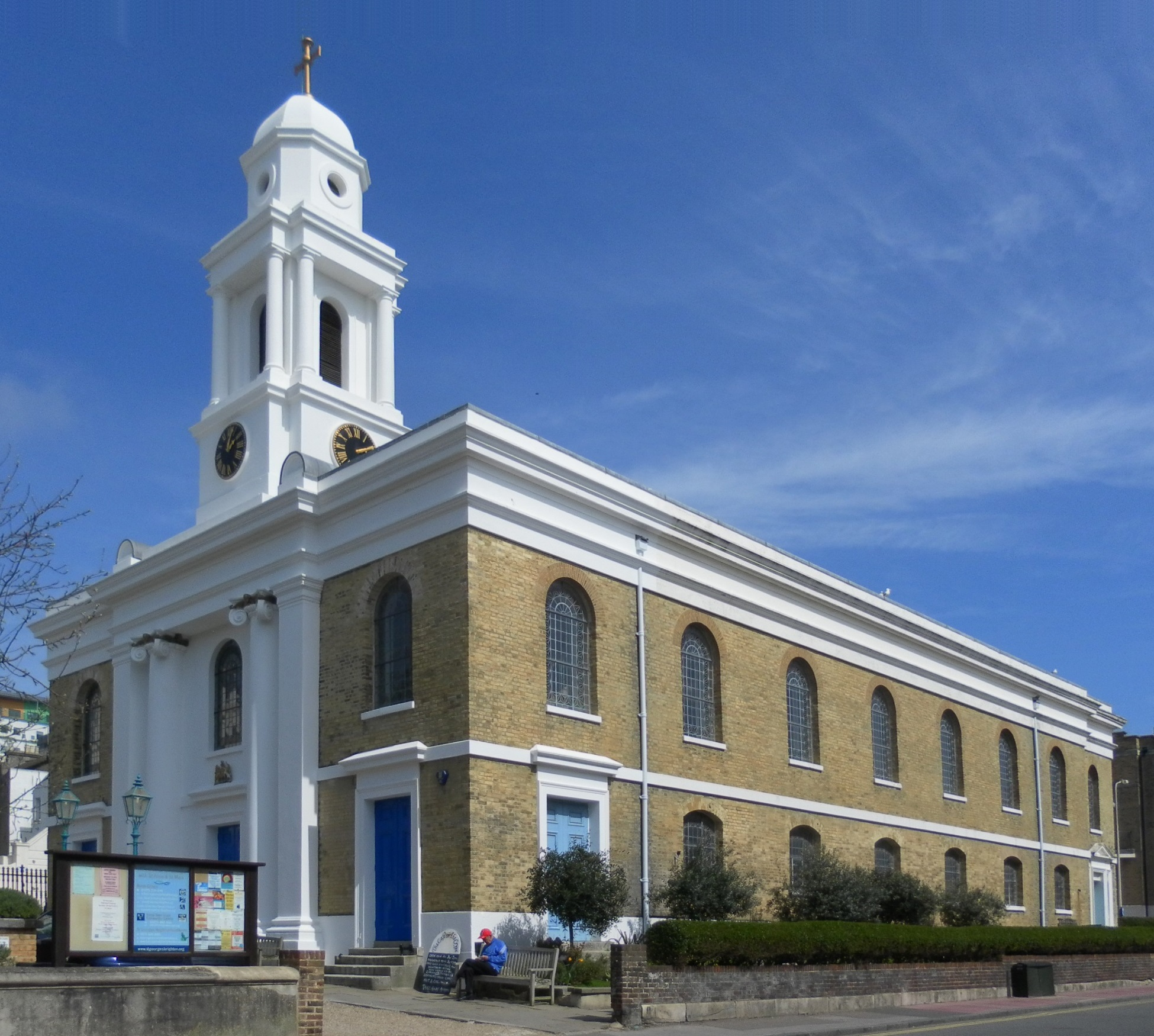
- The church from the southwest
- St George's Church, Brighton
- Denomination: Church of England
- Churchmanship: Broad Church
- Website: www.stgeorgesbrighton.org

History
- Dedication: St George the Martyr

Specifications
- Capacity: 600 in total: 300 (ground floor), 250 (First balcony), 50 (upper fisherman's balcony).

Administration
- Province: Canterbury
- Diocese: Chichester
- Archdeaconry: Chichester
- Deanery: Rural Deanery of Brighton
- Parish: Brighton, St George with St Anne and St Mark

Clergy
- Vicar: Revd Andrew Manson-Brailsford

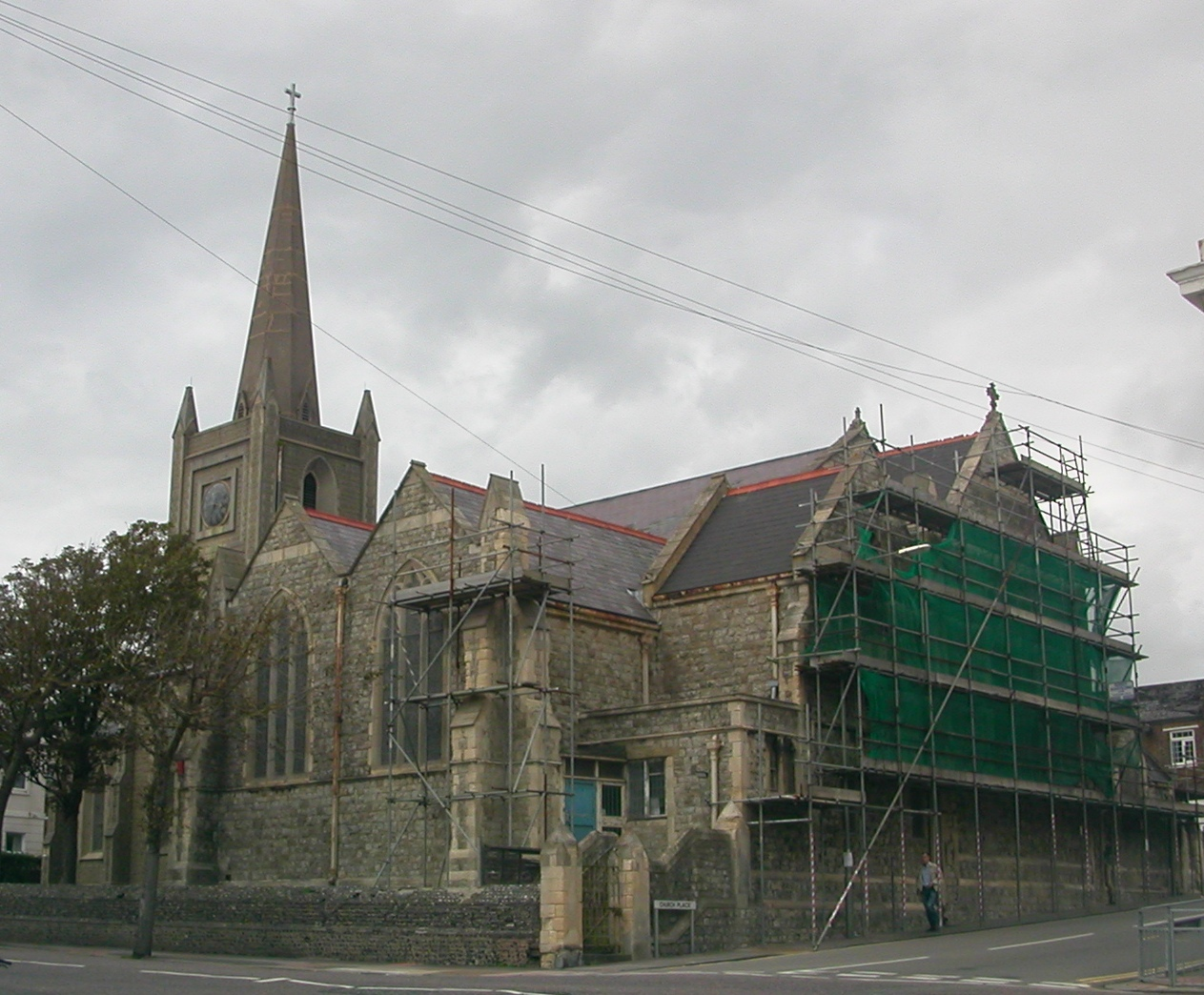
The former St Mark's Church, whose parish was absorbed by St George's.

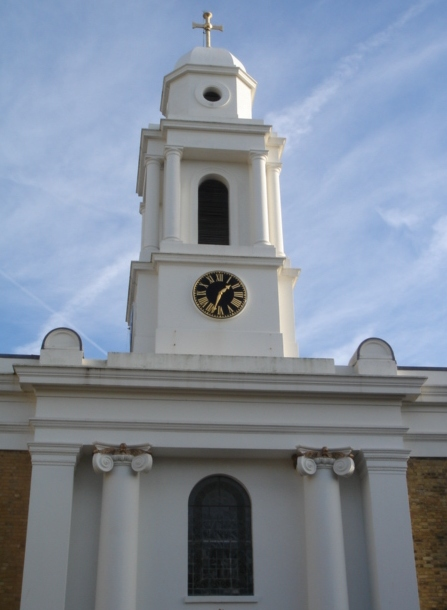
The square tower, clock and cupola at the western end.

St George's Church is an Anglican church in the Kemptown area of Brighton, in the English city of Brighton and Hove. It was built at the request of Thomas Read Kemp, who had created and financed the Kemp Town estate on the cliffs east of Brighton in the early 19th century, and is now regarded as the parish church of the wider Kemptown area. It is a Grade II listed building.

== History ==
Thomas Read Kemp, born in 1782 in Lewes, East Sussex, returned to the Church of England in 1823, seven years after founding his own independent sect. Turning his attention to architecture and town planning, he decided to create a residential estate on land beyond the existing eastern boundary of Brighton, with large houses for affluent people. Designed by Charles Busby and Amon Wilds and built by Thomas Cubitt, this estate became Kemp Town, although Kemp had fled the country to escape debts by the time construction finished.

Brighthelmston Chapel Act 1824
- Act of Parliament
- Parliament of the United Kingdom
- Long title: An Act for building a Chapel in the Eastern Parts of the Town of Brighthelmston in the County of Sussex.
- Citation: 5 Geo. 4. c. 11 Pr.

Dates
- Royal assent: 3 June 1824

The Busby–Wilds partnership had also been responsible for building the Holy Trinity chapel (in Ship Street in central Brighton) for Kemp's sect, and in 1824 Kemp enlisted Busby to build a church to serve the new estate. He obtained a private act of Parliament, the Brighthelmston Chapel Act 1824 (5 Geo. 4. c. 11 Pr.) on 3 June 1824, which allowed him to appoint a perpetual curate and derive income from the rental or sale of pews. This was a common procedure at the time: it allowed churches to be built as an investment, and pew rental could be quite profitable.

Construction work continued throughout 1824 and 1825. The church opened on 1 January 1826, two days after it was consecrated by the Bishop of Chichester. The final cost was £11,000.

By 1831, Kemp had sold his interest in the church to Laurence Peel,^{[A]} the son of Sir Robert Peel, 1st Baronet, who lived in Sussex Square in Kemp Town. Upon Peel's death in 1888 it passed to his son, Charles Lennox Peel, who sold it to the congregation the following year. It was then passed into trust.

St George's had been parished since 1879. The Diocese of Chichester considered closing the church in 1962, but the congregation contested the decision and the threat was lifted. The parish later absorbed that of St Anne's Church in nearby Burlington Street, whose congregation was in decline; it was closed and demolished in 1986. In 1986, St Mark's Church was also closed and officially made redundant, and its parish was also amalgamated with that of St George. The building is now the chapel of St Mary's Hall, an independent school.

== Architecture ==
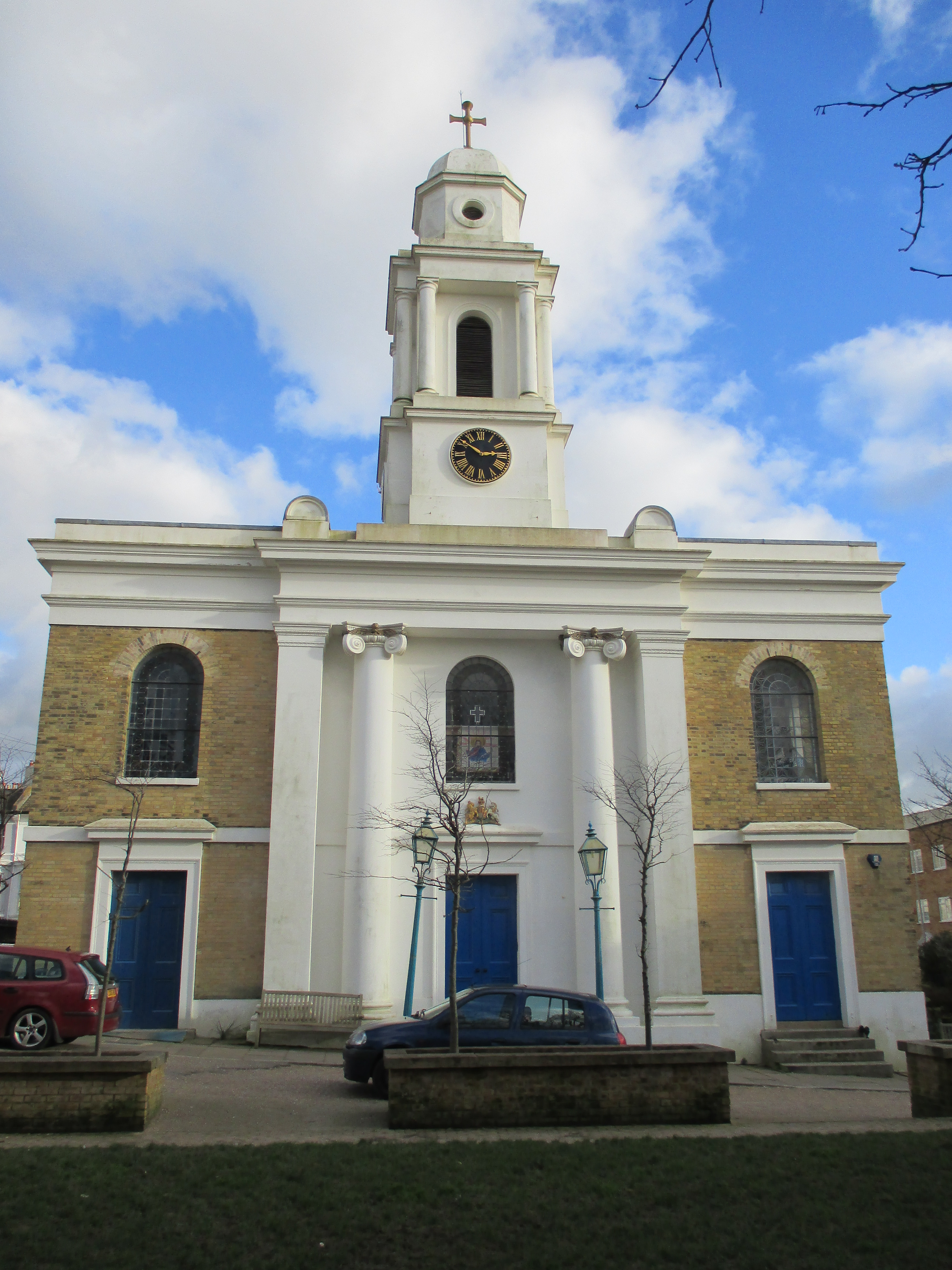
The church from the west

Busby designed St George's Church in a Neoclassical style, with simple clean lines and strong symmetry. The exterior consists of yellow brick with some stucco work, regularly spaced tiered pairs of round-headed windows, and a deep cornice with no ornamentation. The western face, where the entrance is situated, has Ionic columns and pilasters on each side of the door, and a central tower topped by a cupola with a small cross. Clock faces were added on each side soon in 1840. Inside, there are galleries at the northern, southern and western sides, reached by curved staircases. There was a three-tier pulpit in front of the reredos at the eastern end, and the organ, by the J.C. Bishop & Son organ builder firm, was initially inside the western gallery.

After Revd James Anderson became curate of the church in 1828, his close association with Queen Adelaide, the consort of King William IV, made the church very popular. The queen consort was popular with the British people and often spent time in Brighton. When in the town, she worshipped at St George's. By 1831, the church's seating capacity was being exceeded, and a new gallery was added at the western end. Thomas Cubitt's building firm completed this in one week. The organ had to be moved from the original western gallery to make room for the new structure; unusually, it was erected behind the altar at the eastern end.

After it was acquired by the congregation and placed in trust, £11,050 was spent on large-scale alterations to the church. A chancel was added at the eastern end, with a new window in the eastern wall; the reredos was replaced with a larger version; the organ was moved again, into a more conventional position in the south gallery; and both the north and the south galleries were rebuilt at their eastern ends to align with the chancel extension. All of the seating was replaced, increasing the capacity to 1,300.

== The church today ==
St George's was a chapel of ease until 1879, when it was given its own parish. In its present form, incorporating the former parishes of St Anne and St Mark, this covers a large area of eastern Brighton, including the whole of Kemptown, parts of Whitehawk, Brighton Marina and Roedean School.

The church has a community centre at which various groups meet regularly, and a café, in the crypt below the building. The café is operated in partnership with a local special school. The crypt facilities were built (along with some supporting structural work for the rest of the church) with support from the European Union's "URBAN" regeneration fund, for which they had to compete with other local projects.

St George's also acts as one of Brighton's largest venues for alternative and folk music concerts.

== See also ==
- Grade II listed buildings in Brighton and Hove: S
- List of places of worship in Brighton and Hove

== Notes ==
- ^{A} Dale 1989 and the St George's Church website incorrectly identify Peel's name as Lawrence.

== Bibliography ==
- Dale, Antony (1989). Brighton Churches. London: Routledge. ISBN 0-415-00863-8.
