= St Mary's Hall, Brighton =

Coordinates: 50.8183°N 0.1130°W

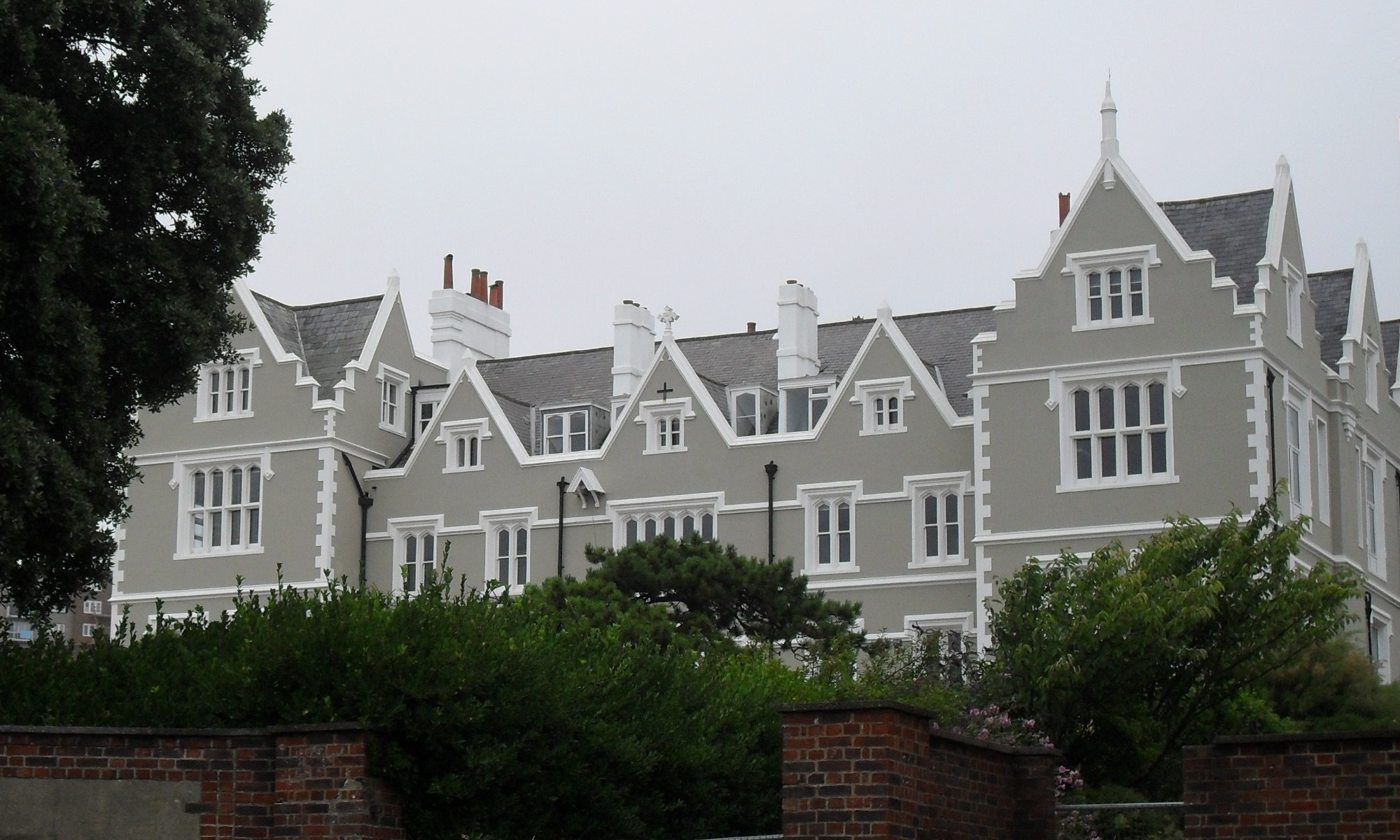
- The former school in 2010

Location
- Eastern Road, Brighton, Brighton and Hove, BN2 5JF, United Kingdom; England

Information
- School type: Secondary, private
- Motto: Before Honor is Humility
- Founded: 1836
- Founder: Rev. Henry Venn Elliott
- Status: Closed 2009, merged with Roedean School

St Mary's Hall was a private school for girls in Brighton, Sussex, England. It was established in 1836 by Rev. Henry Venn Elliott and merged with Roedean School in 2009 due to "economic circumstances", that "left it with no choice but to close and end 173 years of independence".

== History ==
George Basevi designed the Hall in the Early Tudor style in 1836, "with mullioned windows and a cross above the central gable", and the Marquess of Bristol donated nine acres of land to build the school. Rev. Henry Venn Elliott founded the school for the "daughters of poor clergy" in 1836. Elliott chose to locate the Hall in Brighton because "the Prince Regent had made it a popular place to live", and Elliott believed there would be many wealthy families in that locale seeking governesses. Early school registers, however, do not show many graduates were thus employed.

In 1838, the school had 50 students. By 1861, the school had 120 students, and the school's Patron was the Archbishop of Canterbury, its President, the Bishop of Chichester, and its Secretary and Treasurer, Rev. H.V. Elliott.

The school's chapel and concert hall, formerly St Mark's Church, was consecrated in 1849. Built by Thomas Shelbourne in Early English style, it has an 1860 memorial window and monument to the Marquess of Bristol.

In 1860, contributions and legacies totaled £1319, and pupils' payments, £2,812. In 1877, the Handbook for Travellers to Sussex described the school as "an excellent institution for education orphan daughters of clergymen as governesses, on payment of £20 per annum".

The Hall was expanded in 1920 when daughters of laymen were admitted. The first pupil to go on to Oxford or Cambridge was Victoria Laughland who went to St Hilda's College in the 1960s to read French and German. A new hall was added in 1969, and in 1976 the school erected a classroom block and swimming-pool. Venn House for sixth-formers was added in 1981, and the school added a junior school block in 1983, and a pre-preparatory block in 1989. By 1990, the school had more than 400 pupils.

=== School merger and closure ===
School officials considered admitting boys during 2007. St Mary's reported £1.93 million in debts in 2008, as well as losses in four of the previous five years. Eventually, St Mary's Hall, Brighton, was merged with Roedean School in 2009 due to "economic circumstances" that "left it with no choice but to close and end 173 years of independence".

When Roedean closed St Mary's Hall in 2009, eleven remaining teachers lost their jobs. Roedean sold the buildings to Royal Sussex County Hospital to serve as temporary facilities for departments displaced during its redevelopment project. Redevelopment of the buildings began in 2013.

== Notable former pupils ==
- Victoria Laughland (1944–1994), charity founder
- Natascha McElhone (born 1969), actress
- Fiona Mont (born 1970), former fugitive, "Britain's Most Wanted Woman"
- Sarah Murray (born 1970), Scottish Episcopal priest and Provost of Inverness Cathedral
- Anna Campbell (1991–2018), anti-ISIS guerrilla fighter of the YPJ killed by Turkish airstrikes in 2018, daughter of rock musician Mont Campbell
