= Tory Laughland =

British social worker (1944-1994)

Victoria "Tory" Laughland
- fair use image
- Born: Victoria Nicola Christina Jarman; 11 July 1944; Weston Favell
- Died: 19 July 1994 (aged 50); City of Westminster
- Occupation: social worker
- Known for: starting a charity
- Spouse: Bruce Laughland QC
- Children: one

Tory Laughland formally Victoria Nicola Christina Laughland born Victoria Nicola Christina Jarman (11 July 1944 – 19 July 1994) was a British social worker and charity administrator who started the "Who Cares" magazine which is now the "Become" charity.

== Life ==
Laughland was born in Weston Favell in 1944. Her mother was a German born nurse named Helene Mariana Klenk who had come to England and she had started Brighton's Rudolf Steiner School. Her mother had married Archibald Seymour (Archie) Jarman who was a flight lieutenant in the Royal Air Force. Her father looked after the Jarman estate when her left the forces and Victoria was able to travel to Pfaffenhofen in Bavaria where she enjoyed jolidays with her mother's sister. Her brothers were sent to public school but she attended day schools. St Mary's Hall, Brighton's first pupil to go on to Oxford or Cambridge was Laughland who went on to St Hilda's College in the 1960s to read French and German. She gained a second class degree in 1966 and married Bruce Laughland, a lawyer, in 1969.

She studied social work at the London School of Economics. In 1980 she was appointed a guardian Ad litem to look after the interests of children during court procedures.

In 1978 a "Who Cares" group had been established in Westminster. A charter of rights for children who were in care had been published in 1977. Laughland was part of this group. In 1983 this group of social workers decided to found a magazine for children in care. Laughland was the magazine's editor. The purpose was for them to realise that they were not alone and they could read about children in similar situations and the stories of elder children as they succeeded. The called their local publication the "Who Cares?" magazine. The magazine was a success and its circulation and readership increased.

The "Who Cares Trust" was formally founded in 26 March 1992.

In 1993 she was diagnosed with mesothelioma and she was keen to find out the prognosis, but she only told those closest to her of her fate.

== Death and legacy ==
Laughland died in hospital in the City of Westminster in 1994 just after her 50th birthday. The Who Cares Trust ended as a concept on 15 November 2016 and it became the "Become" charity.

== Private life ==
Laughland married (Graham Franklyn) Bruce Laughland QC who was a lawyer and judge. They had one child, Francis.Her husband married again and died in 2002. He said that his liberal views of offenders was strongly influenced by his first wife.
