= Fiona Mont =

English fugitive (born 1970)

Mont in 2006

Fiona Mary Hesketh (born Fiona Mary Mont, and known as "The Cat", 1 April 1970) is an English former fugitive who became known as "Britain's Most Wanted Woman" during a major police and media hunt in connection with allegations of corporate fraud.

The chase lasted for three years (1999–2002) and covered much of Europe, including the Netherlands, Belgium, France, Spain, Gibraltar, and Portugal. She was featured on BBC TV Crimewatch and ITV, and newspapers printed various accounts of her possible whereabouts. She and Graham Hesketh, her partner in flight, were frequently likened to Bonnie and Clyde. Despite the investigations of the UK press, her whereabouts were unknown throughout the entire period.

Mont has always maintained her innocence of the alleged fraud.

== Early life ==
Mont is the daughter of Neville Mont, who was an Under Sheriff of Sussex, and Joan Mont, a former Conservative leader of East Sussex County Council. She attended secondary school at St. Mary's Hall, Brighton and subsequently in Canada where she lived with relatives during 1986. On her return from Canada, she took a job with the Gemini Business Centre in Hove.

== First arrest and flight ==
In September 1999, she was arrested. The officer leading the case was Detective Constable Stephen Skerrett of the Steyning Station of Sussex Police. After she was released, her car was found near Beachy Head (an infamous suicide spot). The Coast Guard mounted a two-day search operation before her mother admitted to receiving a phone call from her. It was reported that she had fled the country in a light aircraft piloted by Graham Hesketh from Shoreham Airport. She denied the allegations against her via a website.

Mont was featured on BBC television's Crimewatch in 2000 as wanted for questioning in relation to allegations of £300,000 of computer fraud, which she denied. She later appeared the same year in an ITV production similar to Crimewatch entitled "Britain's Most Wanted": in this programme, DC Skerrett, also a pilot, flew an aircraft for the reconstruction of events. The following day, the tabloids adopted the title of the programme as a nickname for Mont.

Mont and Graham Hesketh settled in Spain in a small caravan. Hesketh worked as a bricklayer, and they had their first child in 2001. Media allegations that she had set up a website to taunt police and sent them emails saying 'Catch me if you can' were denied by Mont.

== Second arrest and disappearance ==
Mont was arrested on the Costa del Sol in January 2002 and taken to Madrid to await extradition proceedings, but after the Spanish authorities released her on bail, she vanished again.

The Guardian reported in 2004 that the couple had a son born at Worthing hospital in late 2003 and that Mont was living in a caravan near Brighton. According to the Guardian, since Skerrett's departure from the police force, much of the interest in pursuing the alleged fraud disappeared. The case against Mont was eventually dropped – a joint decision by the Police and Crown Prosecution Service, according to a spokesman for the force. Graham Hesketh complained to the Press Complaints Commission about the behaviour of the Sunday Mirror.
