= Edward Bishop Elliott =

English theologian and clergyman (1793–1875)

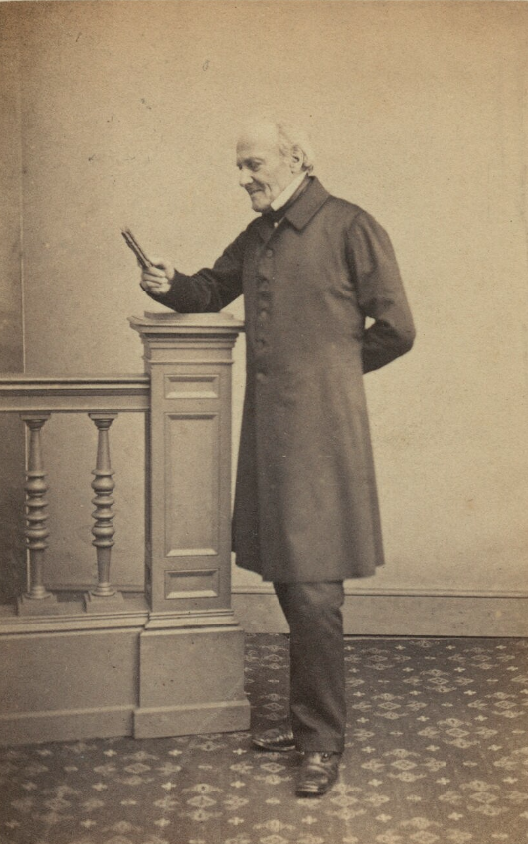
Edward Bishop Elliott by T & J Holroyd (1860s)

Edward Bishop Elliott (24 July 1793, in Paddington – 30 June 1875) was an English clergyman, preacher and premillennarian writer.

Elliott graduated from Trinity College, Cambridge in 1816, and he was given the vicarage of Tuxford, Nottinghamshire in 1824 then later was made prebendary of Heytesbury, Wiltshire. In 1849, he became incumbent of St Mark's Church, Kemptown, Brighton. Elliott was evangelical, premillennial and an ardent supporter of missions. Thoroughly equipped as a scholar, he spent a lifetime in the study of biblical prophecy.

Edward's most notable work is the eschatological study, Horae Apocalypticae (Hours of the Apocalypse), which Charles Spurgeon referred to as the standard work for commentary on the book of Revelation and the Apocalypse. Elliott held to the historicist view of eschatology that the book of Revelation covers history from the time of the apostle John up to the second advent of Christ.

== Personal life ==
His siblings included the divine, Henry Venn Elliott, and the hymnist, Charlotte Elliott; their maternal grandfather was Henry Venn of Clapham Sect; and their uncle was John Venn, Rector of Clapham.

Elliott's father-in-law was Sir Richard Steele, 3rd Baronet (1775–1850).

His daughter was the hymnist, Emily Elizabeth Steele Elliott.
