= Henry Venn Elliott =

English divine

Henry Venn Elliott (1792–1865) was an English divine.

== Early years ==
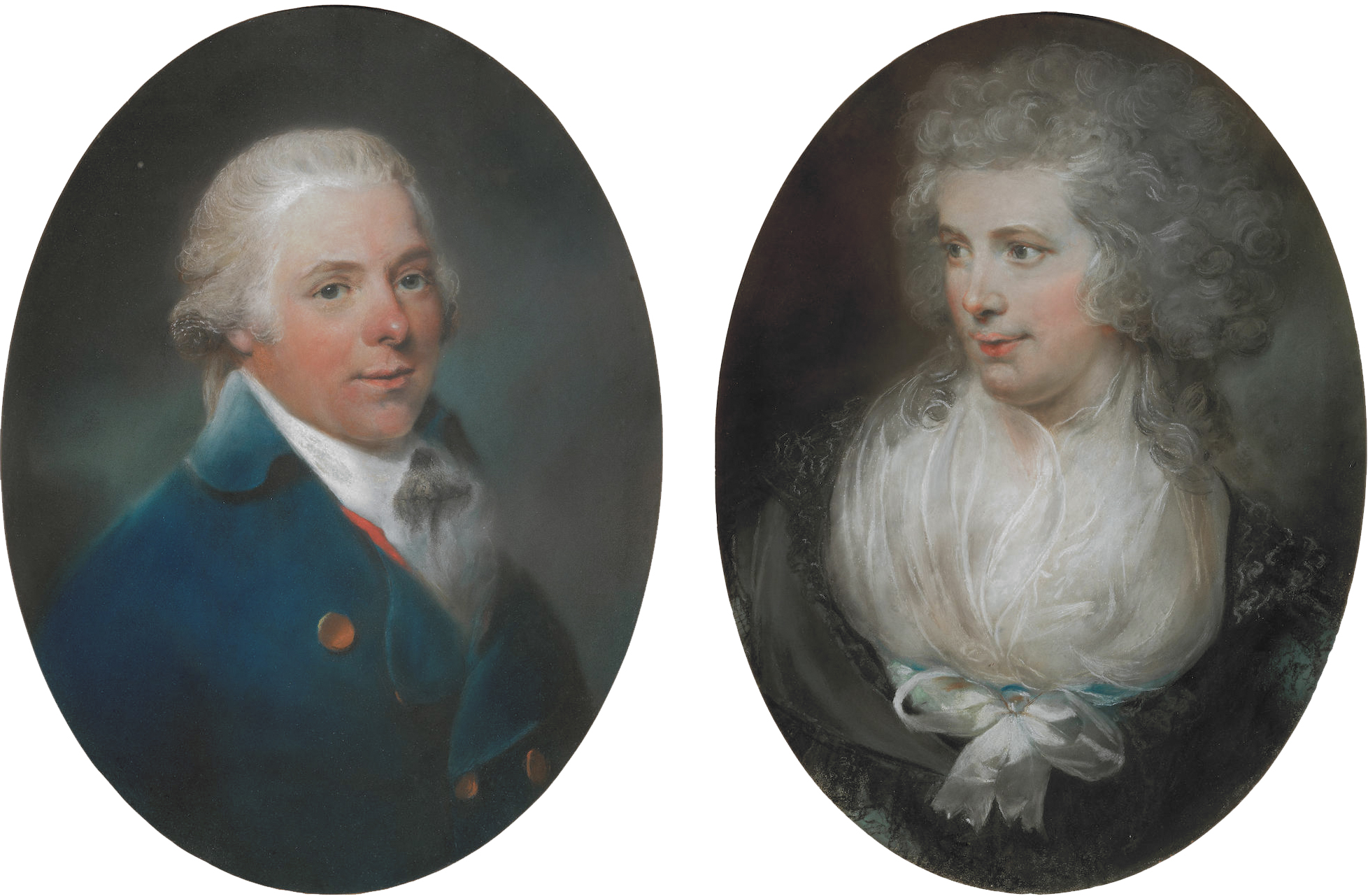
His parents Charles Elliott (1752–1826) and Eling Venn (John Russell, 1789)

Elliott was born 17 January 1792, the son of Charles Elliott of Grove House, Clapham, and his second wife, Eling, daughter of Henry Venn, the well-known vicar of Huddersfield. Charles Elliott had eight children by his second marriage; Henry Venn was his eldest son and fourth child; other children included Charlotte Elliott and Edward Bishop Elliott. Henry Venn was sent to school, under a Mr. Elwell of Hammersmith, at the age of eight. In January 1809 he was transferred to the Rev. H. Jowett of Little Dunham, Norfolk. He went to Trinity College, Cambridge, in October 1810; became a scholar of his college in 1811; and graduated as fourteenth wrangler in 1814, winning also the second chancellor's medal. He was elected to a fellowship of Trinity in October 1816.

== Career ==
He had suffered from overwork, and in July 1817 set out to recover his health by a foreign tour, which extended to Greece, Constantinople, and Jerusalem, a journey attended with some risk in those days. He returned to England in August 1820 . He lived at Cambridge for some time, and was ordained deacon in November 1823 and priest in June 1824. After holding the curacy of Ampton, Suffolk, for two years, he returned to Cambridge in 1825. His father had now moved to Westfield Lodge, Brighton, and soon afterwards built the proprietary chapel of St. Mary's in that town. It was consecrated 18 January 1827. Elliott was appointed the first preacher, and inherited the property upon his father's death, on 15 October 1832. For a few years previous to 1832 Elliott held also the priory of St. John's, Wilton, near Salisbury. He took pupils for a time, among whom were Sir Edward Fowell Buxton and the sons of Lord Aberdeen. He was afterwards fully occupied by his various duties. In 1832 he made proposals for the foundation of a school for the daughters of poor clergymen, in imitation of the school founded by his friend William Carus Wilson at Cowan Bridge, Yorkshire, in 1823. The school was opened as St. Mary's Hall on 1 Aug. 1836. Elliott himself gave liberal donations, many of them anonymously, and during the rest of his life took an active part in its management. In September 1849 the new church of St. Mark's, intended to provide for the district of Kemp Town and St. Mary's Hall, was opened, after many obstacles had been overcome by Elliott's energy and liberality. Elliott took a prominent part in providing for the religious needs of Brighton, then rapidly developing. He was a sincere evangelical, and especially anxious for the strict observance of Sunday. In 1852 he spoke at a public meeting against the proposal for opening the Crystal Palace on Sundays, and his remarks were taken to amount to a charge of venality against the Times for defending the measure. He repudiated the intention, but was severely censured for his rash language.

== Family ==
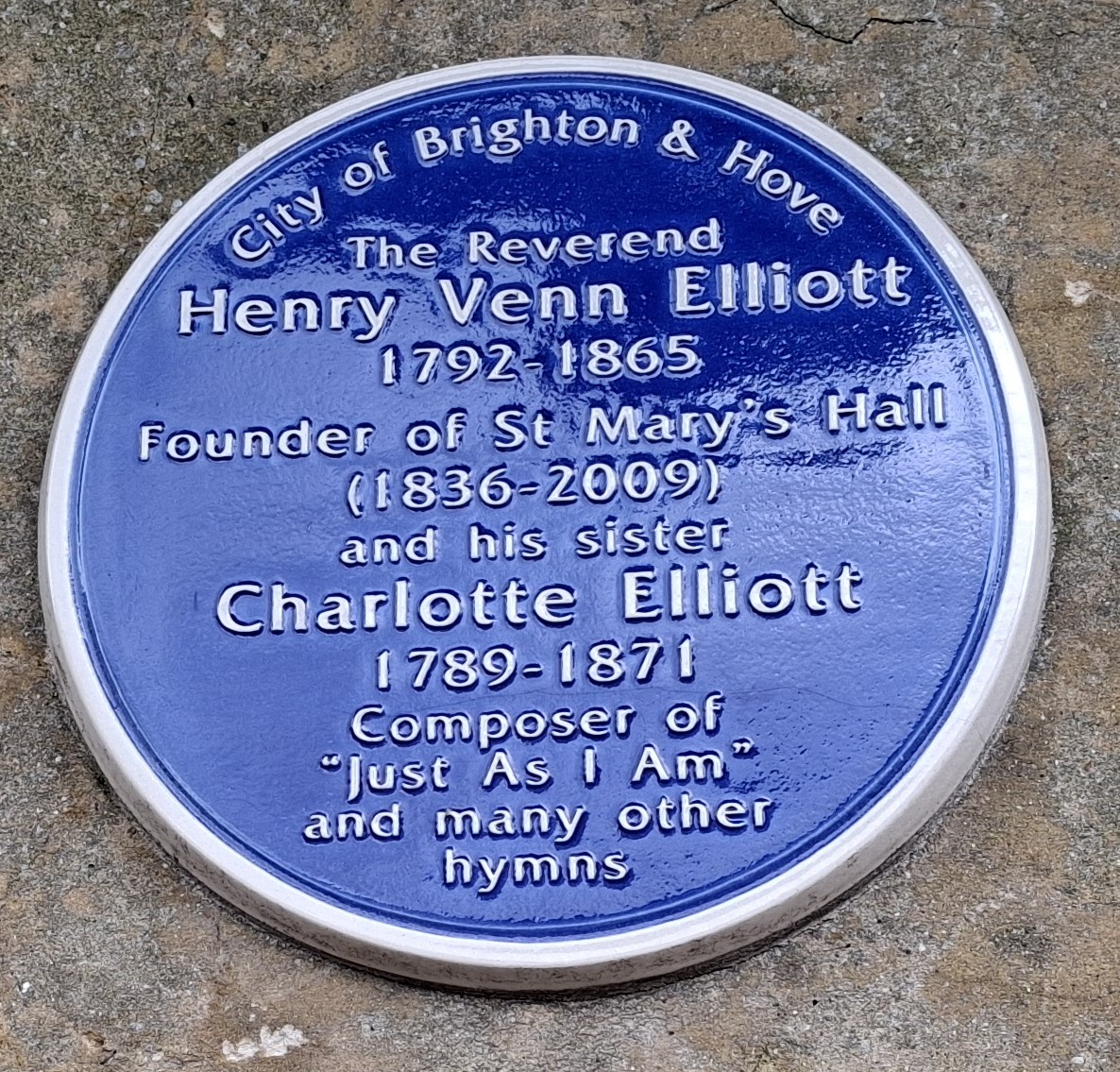
Blue Plaque on the wall outside St Mary's Hall on Eastern Road, Brighton to: The Reverend Henry Venn Elliott 1792-1865 Founder of St Mary's Hall (1836-2009) and his sister Charlotte Elliott 1789-1871 Composer of "Just As I Am" and many other hymns.

On 31 October 1833 Elliott married Julia, daughter of John Marshall of Hallsteads, Ulleswater, some of whose religious poems are given in Lord Selborne's 'Book of Praise.' She died of scarlet fever on 3 November 1841, her fifth child, Julius, having been born on 24 October. Her death was followed by those of his mother, 16 April 1843, his favourite sister, Mary, three months later, and his eldest son, Henry Venn, from the effects of a fall, on 2 June 1848. His second son, Charles Alfred, became a distinguished member of the Indian civil service. Julius Marshall, the third son, was killed on the Schreckhorn 27 July 1869. Elliott died at Brighton on 24 January 1865. He left two daughters.

== Works ==
His works consist of a number of separate sermons and a collection of hymns.
