= Steele baronets =

Extinct baronetcy in the Baronetage of Ireland

The Steele, later Steele-Graves, later Steele Baronetcy, of Hampstead (near Dublin), was a title in the Baronetage of Ireland. It was created on 12 February 1768 for Richard Steele. The fourth Baronet assumed the additional surname of Graves in 1862. However, the fifth Baronet not being a descendant of the fourth used the surname Steele only. The title became either extinct or dormant on his death in 1876.

== Steele, later Steele-Graves, later Steele baronets, of Hampstead (1768) ==
- Sir Richard Steele, 1st Baronet(1701–1785)
- Sir Parker Steele, 2nd Baronet (c. 1735–1787)
- Sir Richard Steele, 3rd Baronet (1775–1850)
- Sir John Maxwell Steele-Graves, 4th Baronet (1812–1872)
- Sir Frederick Ferdinand Armstead Steele, 5th Baronet (1787–1876), brother of 3rd Baronet
