= Three-self formula =

Mission strategy to establish indigenous churches

The three-self formula or three-self principle is a missiological strategy to establish indigenous churches. Its principles are: self-governance, self-support (i.e., financial independence from foreigners), and self-propagation (i.e., indigenous missionary work). It was coined in the late-19th century by various missions theorists, and is still used today in certain contexts such as in the Three-Self Patriotic Movement in mainland China.

== History ==
The three principles of self-governance, self-support (i.e., financial independence from foreigners), and self-propagation (i.e., indigenous missionary work) were first articulated by Henry Venn, General Secretary of the Church Missionary Society from 1841 to 1873, and Rufus Anderson, foreign secretary of the American Board of Commissioners for Foreign Missions. The "Nevius Method", named for John Livingstone Nevius, a missionary to China and Korea, developed the three-self principle of Venn and Anderson into a plan establishing indigenous churches.

By 1877 three-self principles were much discussed among missionaries to China. The principles were drafted formally during an 1892 conference in Shanghai of Christian missions reflecting an almost universal agreement that the future of the Chinese church depended on the indigenization of the leadership, and the finding of sufficiently Chinese modes of worship.

In the early 20th century Roland Allen, a former Anglican missionary to China wrote two influential books that promoted the concept of indigenous churches based on the three-self principle.

The Three-Self Patriotic Movement (TSPM) in mainland China, now the officially sanctioned form of Protestant Christianity in China, took these principles as foundational for its establishment. However, in its alignment with China's United Front Work Department, the TSPM sought to unify all Christians in China behind the government's political and social agenda and thus politicized matters of religious belief and practice and "subordinated the religious mission of the church to the political agenda of the Communist Party". This represented a fundamental change in the concept of the three-self principle from a religious one to a political one. The TSPM’s implementation resulted in the suppression of other expressions of three-self principles that pre-existed it.

Some scholars of mission, such as Paul Hiebert and David Bosch, have later argued that there needs to now be a fourth "self", self-theologizing.

== See also ==
- Indigenous church mission theory
- Contextual theology
