= John Wesley Haley =

Pastor

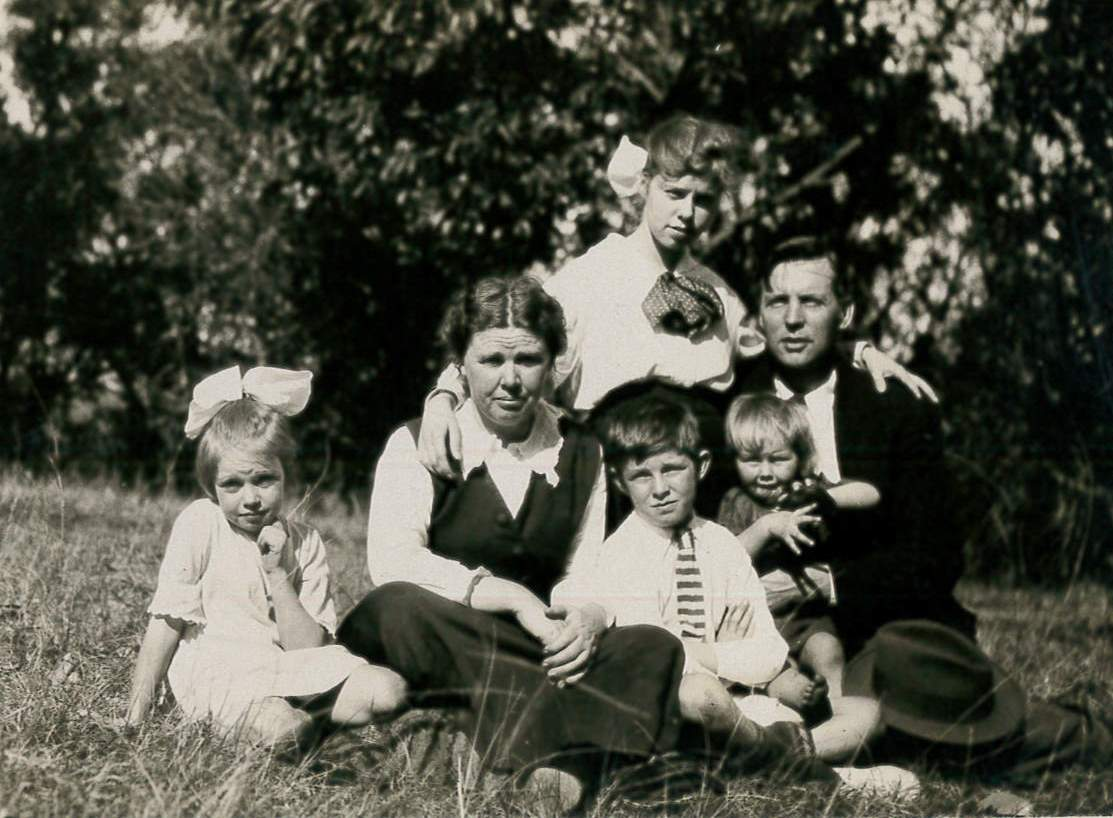
John Wesley Haley and family (ca 1921)

John Wesley Haley (August 25, 1878, Bracebridge, Ontario, Canada - January 26, 1951, Cleveland, Ohio, USA) was pastor, missionary and mission strategist. He grew up in a farming family near Sarnia, Ontario, was involved in church planting in Saskatchewan, worked as a missionary in Mozambique, South Africa, and Burundi. After serving for many years as a Free Methodist Church missionary in Southern Africa, Haley and his family moved to Burundi in the African Great Lakes Region and initiated new church planting work. Haley was profoundly influenced by the writings of Roland Allen and the idea of the indigenous church principle in cross-cultural mission strategy.

== Early life ==
John Wesley Haley was born in Bracebridge (Muskoka), Ontario on August 25, 1878. His family moved to Sombra, Ontario. In 1898, John Haley was converted at a Free Methodist camp meeting held on his father's farm in Lambton County, Ontario. In 1900, he was appointed by the West Ontario Conference to assist Rev. W.H. Wilson in pioneering in Western Canada (Manitoba/Saskatchewan). In 1901, he was granted a local preacher's license.

== Career ==
Haley sailed for Africa in 1902 where he spent many years as a missionary in Mozambique (first called Portuguese East Africa) and South Africa.

As previously arranged, Esther Jane (Jennie) Hamilton, who was born in Charlemont, Ontario, June 24, 1877, joined him in 1905 and they married on March 15, 1905, in Fairview, near Umzumbe, Natal, South Africa. On January 6, 1906, Their first child, Florence, was born in Durban, Natal, South Africa.

For health and family reasons, the Haleys left Africa in 1909 and, following medical advice to get onto the land, took up "homesteading" in Saskatchewan on a section of land that was given them by the Canadian government. On October 22, 1910, their son Blake was born.

In 1913, the Haley moved from Saskatchewan to take up a small church in Niagara Falls, Ontario. On August 24, 1914, Dorothy was born in Niagara Falls, Ontario.

Holding up their return to Africa, the Haleys moved from Niagara Falls to Sarnia to care for Haley's ailing mother and sister in September 1915.

In 1915, Bishop Wilson T Hogue of the Free Methodist Church, in his massive History of the Free Methodist Church of North America, spoke of Haley as one of the best missionaries in their movement

In 1917, the Haleys returned to Fairview, Natal, South Africa, where they lived for about six years. July 7, 1919, Peace was born at Fairview, Natal, South Africa.

In 1932, Haley made a preliminary trip to Burundi.

Without a furlough, Haley moved to Burundi in November 1934, arriving May 2, 1935 at Muyebe, Burundi.

On July 16, 1935, Jennie, Dorothy and Peace joined him at Muyebe. Dorothy's responsibility was to provide teachers for the outschools. Peace dispensed medicine and advice in what became later known as the "Morning Glory Clinic."

Planning to retire in South Africa in the spring, John Wesley Haley died at his daughter's home in Cleveland, Ohio on January 26, 1951, at the age of 72 and was buried in Welland, Ontario. Esther Jane ("Jennie") (Hamilton) Haley died in April 1952.

== Publications ==
Haley contributed a chapter, "Our Work at Inhambane from 1902-1907" in Our Free Methodist Missions in Africa, 1908.

Haley, Life in Mozambique and South Africa, 1926.

Haley, But Thy Right Hand, 1949.

A biography of John Wesley Haley, Soul Afire: A Saga of Visionary Leadership (1981), was written by Gerald Bates, a Free Methodist Church missionary to Burundi, although not during Haley's lifetime.
