= John Thornton (philanthropist) =

British merchant and Christian philanthropist (1720–1790)

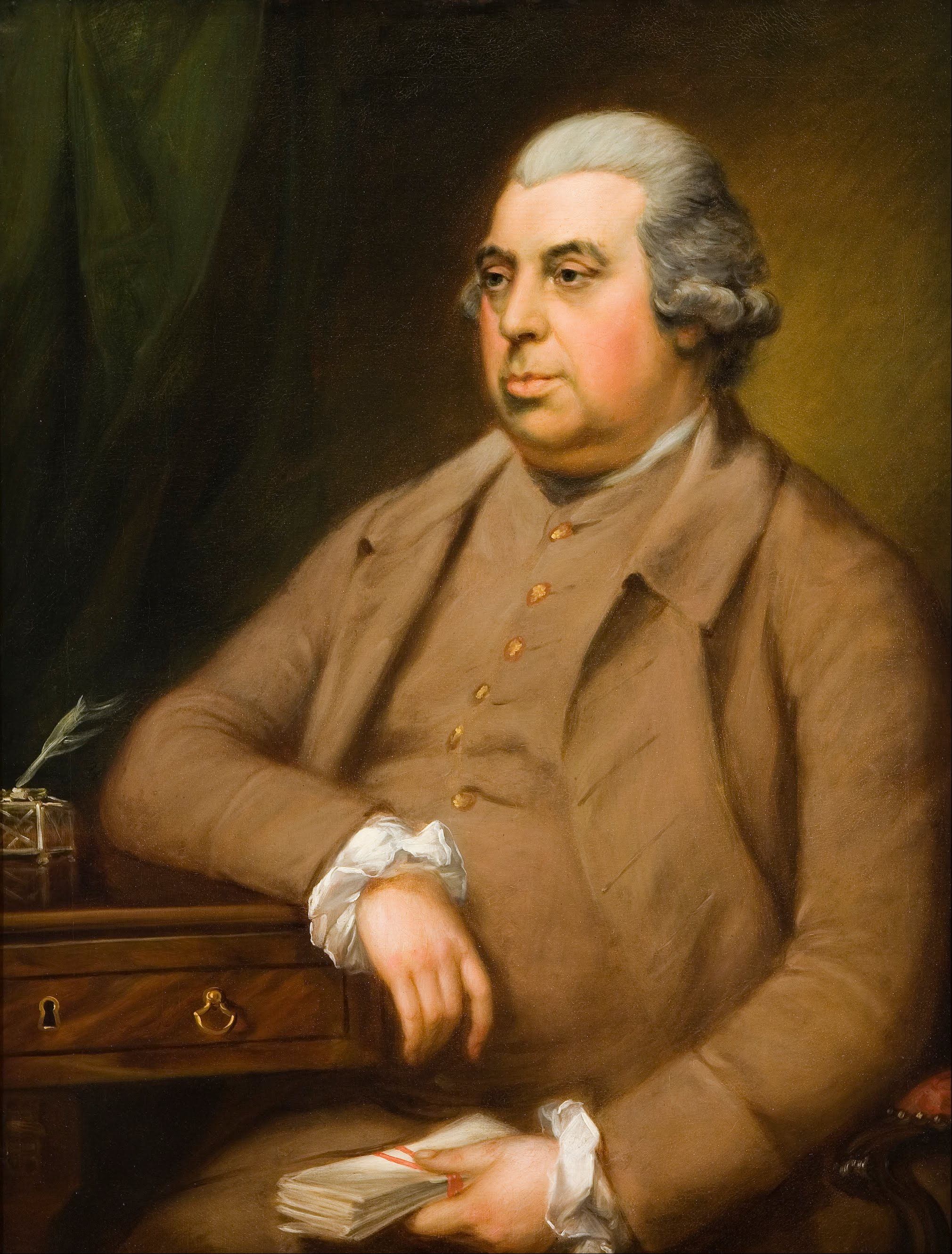
Portrait of John Thornton (Thomas Gainsborough)

John Thornton (1720–1790) was a British merchant and Christian philanthropist who became wealthy through investment in the North Sea Russia trade. In accordance with his Christian faith, he gave much of his money away to good causes, as one of the major philanthropists of the eighteenth century. It was said that, at the time of his death in 1790, Thornton had become the second richest man in Europe.

== Early life and career ==
Descended from a Hull family that had included five generations of merchants and local council officers who had been involved in the North Sea trade for several generations, John Thornton was born in Clapham, south of London in 1720 and was to inherit a huge fortune from his father Robert Thornton of Yorkshire, (1692–1742), a merchant who was to become a director of the Bank of England. His grandfather, also called John (1664–1731), had been one of Hull's leading exporters of lead and cloth to the Baltic nations in the early years of the eighteenth century.

Thornton used his inherited wealth to further his own career as a merchant and banker, also investing heavily in the lucrative Russian and Baltic trades and the recently founded sugar refining trade in Hull, in which he had become a partner. Through these interests he acquired enormous riches, a large proportion of which he donated to philanthropic causes.

== Conversion ==
It is thought that Thornton became a Christian after his marriage to Lucy Watson (daughter of Samuel Watson, one of his partners in the sugar refining business), herself deeply religious, and through his friendship with Rev. Henry Venn, an Anglican preacher who had been appointed curate of Holy Trinity Church, Clapham, around 1754.

His new-found faith had a profound effect on him, and he began giving away his money to individuals and deserving charities, as well as supporting various evangelical enterprises and other charitable causes, a way of living that continued for the rest of his life. For the remainder of his life, Thornton was to give away half of his annual income and donate it to a variety of causes; and to arrange for the printing and distribution of thousands of Bibles and hymnals to churches and schools that had none, as well as supporting preachers in colonial America.

== Philanthropy ==
In 1756, together with Jonas Hanway, another merchant and devout Christian, Thornton became a founder member of the Marine society, a charity set up to house and clothe young men, at the same time as providing much-needed recruits for the Royal Navy in the Seven Years’ War. Two years later, they were among the founders of the Magdalen Hospital for the Reception of Penitent Prostitutes, in Whitechapel, London, the first charitable institution for the care and rehabilitation of prostitutes.

John Thornton travelled extensively and contributed to churches in different parts of England, including Holy Trinity which was to become the centre for the so-called Clapham Sect of Christian social reformers, of which Thornton was the founding father. Firmly believing in the importance of religious education, he used his considerable wealth to pay for the printing of Bibles, which he then arranged to distribute to churches across Britain and mission stations as far as New South Wales and the Caribbean colonies.

Thornton partly sponsored John Newton, the former slave ship captain who became an Anglican preacher and curate at St Peter and St Paul church, Olney, Buckinghamshire from 1764 to 1780, giving him £200 a year. In 1780, he offered Newton the living of St Mary Woolnoth, Lombard Street – the fashionable London church where Newton became established as a noted preacher for over twenty years, and where he ended his days. He also aided religious leader Lady Huntingdon in setting up her training centre Trevecca College in Wales with an interest-free loan.

He was also appointed treasurer of a charitable fund raised in England from 1766 by American colonial preachers Samson Occom and Nathaniel Whitaker for Moor's Charity School, founded by Eleazar Wheelock in Lebanon, Connecticut for the education of native Americans. Wheelock also applied the fund to establish Dartmouth College in Hanover, New Hampshire, and in 1829 the school named one of its main buildings Thornton Hall. Thornton donated a sum of his own money so that Wheelock could build a mansion for the college president in 1771. It still stands in Wheelock Street, Hanover.

== Personal life ==
On 28 November 1753 Thornton married Lucy Watson (1722–1785), daughter of Samuel Watson of Hull, one of his father's business partners. They had four children, including Samuel Thornton (1754–1838), merchant and Governor of the Bank of England and of the Russia Company, and Member of Parliament; Jane Thornton (1757–1818), who later married Alexander Leslie-Melville, 7th Earl of Leven; Robert Thornton (1759–1826), director of the East India Company and Member of Parliament; and Henry Thornton (1760–1815), banker, economist and Member of Parliament, who also followed his father as one of the leaders of the Clapham Sect.

John Thornton sustained a fatal injury as a result of an accident at Bath and died on 7 November 1790. He was buried at Holy Trinity Church, Clapham.
