= Henry Venn =

Henry Venn is the name of:

- Henry Venn (Clapham Sect) (1725–1797), English evangelical minister
- Henry Venn (Church Missionary Society) (1796–1873), pioneer in indigenous missions theory
