= Holy Trinity Church, Clapham =

Church in London, England

Coordinates: 51.4625°N 0.1421°W

Holy Trinity Church
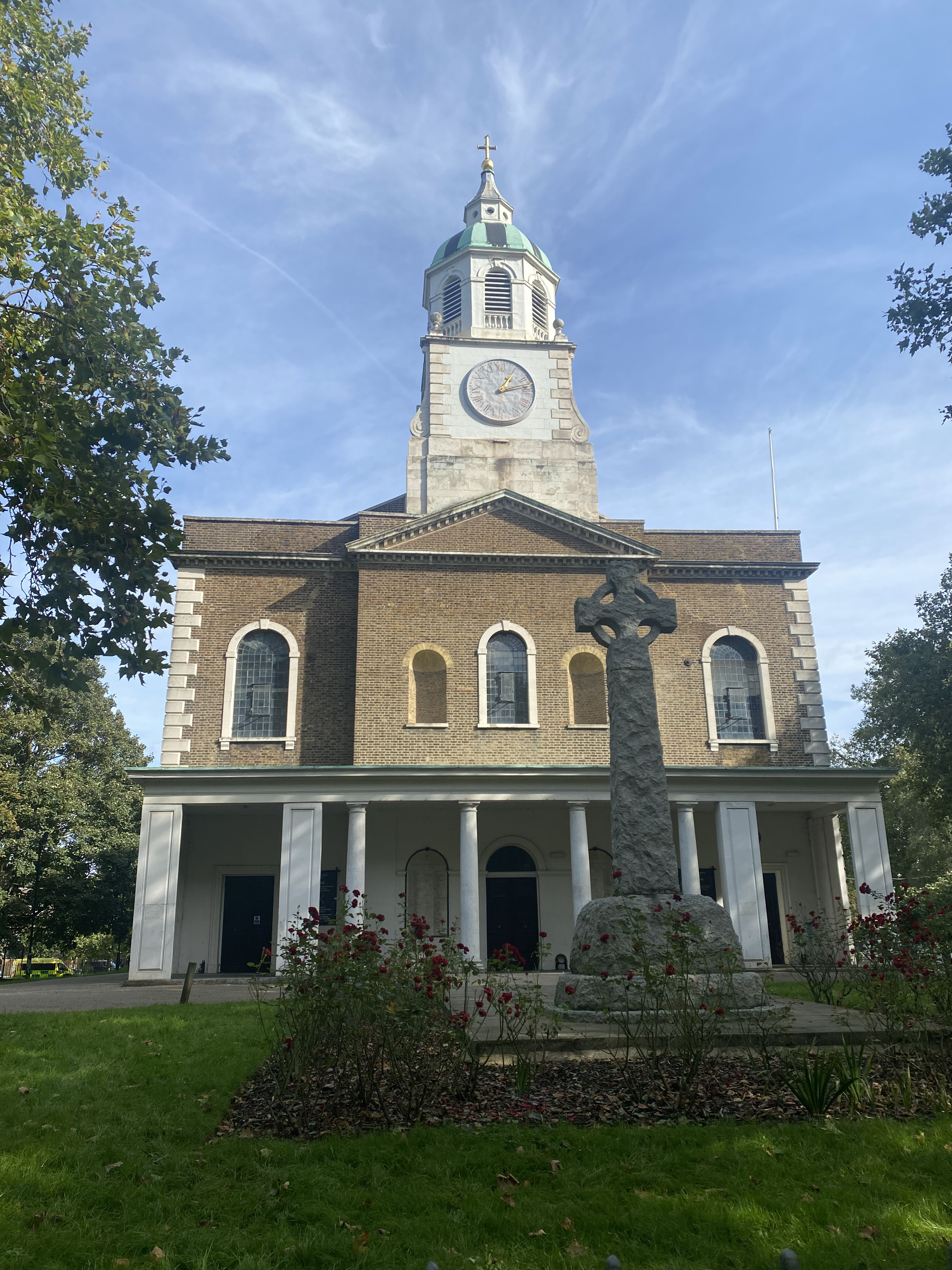
- Holy Trinity Church
- Country: England
- Denomination: Church of England

Architecture
- Functional status: Active
- Heritage designation: Grade II*
- Architect: Kenton Couse
- Completed: 1776
- Construction cost: 1 June 1776

Administration
- Diocese: Southwark
- Archdeaconry: Southwark
- Deanery: Lambeth North
- Parish: Holy Trinity, Clapham

Clergy
- Rector: The Revd Jago Wynne

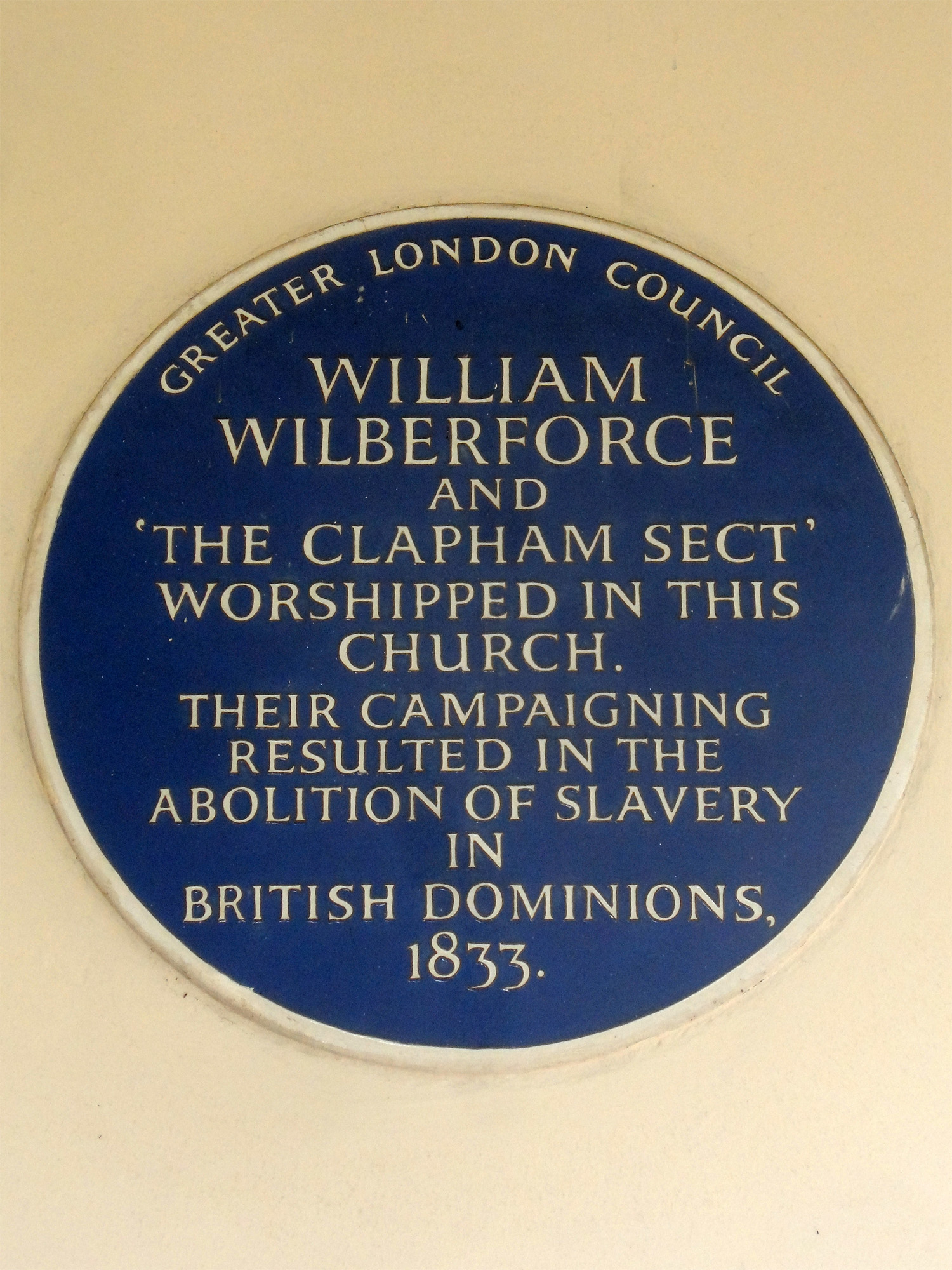
Blue plaque commemorating William Wilberforce and the Clapham Sect

The Holy Trinity Church is an Anglican church located in Clapham, London. Completed in 1776, it was the base for the so-called Clapham Sect who worshipped there. It is located on the north side of Clapham Common and is a Grade II* listed building.

== History ==
Plans for the construction of a new church in Clapham had dated from 1753. The then medieval church had been deemed too small for a growing population and was in a poor state of repair. It was also felt that a new location would be more convenient for the well-to-do parishioners, mostly bankers and merchants who inhabited the mansions surrounding the Common itself. Building on this newly chosen site however required an act of Parliament. A meeting was convened at the Plough Inn between Sir Fletcher Norton, then Speaker, the absentee Rector James Stonhouse, his resident curate Moses Porter and the treasurer, banker and formidable local resident John Thornton. The committee chose for their architect Kenton Couse of the Office of Works. He was contracted to design and build at the cost of £5,000, a building in grey stock brick with Portland stone trimmings, a slate roof and a belfry topped with a small lead dome and a gilded vane. The clock was supplied by Aynsworth Thwaites. The new church was consecrated on 1 June 1776 by the Bishop of Ely.

In 1792, the Reverend John Venn became rector following the death of James Stonhouse. He was the son of Henry Venn who had been curate of the parish some thirty years previously. With his local connections and popular sermons, Venn succeeded not only in drawing more people to worship at Holy Trinity but to make the church the nucleus of a radical movement that was taking hold in the 1790s. As a committed abolitionist Venn formed part of a group of (mostly) evangelical Christians who sought an end to the practice of slavery. This group became known as the Clapham Sect and after the death of John Thornton in 1790, his son Henry Thornton continued the group's work, which included the regular association with senior abolition figures like William Wilberforce and Granville Sharp who would come to worship at Holy Trinity.

The portico of the church was built in 1812 to shelter wealthier parishioners alighting from their carriages. In 1875 a new font was installed, and one of its early christenings was the infant E. M. Forster. Forster was a descendant of the Thornton family and wrote a biography of his great-aunt Marianne Thornton, from whom he had inherited a substantial amount of money. In 1902-03, Arthur Beresford Pite was commissioned to design the present chancel, as well as vestries and a Lady Chapel. The present organ was installed in 1909 by Hunter of Clapham High Street. The church was badly damaged during air raids in the Second World War but restorations were mostly completed by 1952. Numerous tributes to the Clapham Sect exist within the church including a tablet designed by John Shore, Lord Teignmouth, a stained glass window, and a blue plaque which was erected in 1983 on the 150th anniversary of the Slavery Abolition Act 1833. In 1986 a Restoration and Development Trust Fund was set up to fund ongoing repairs and restoration for the future.

The church remains a central part of the local community with many activities, clubs and sports teams taking part in local leagues and initiatives. The HTC football team plays in a local 5-a-side league and competes against other church teams in the annual London Churches Tournament.

== See also ==
- John Hick
- Zachary Macaulay
- James Stephen
