= Indigenous church mission theory =

Christian theory

Indigenous churches are churches suited to local culture and led by local Christians. There have been two main Protestant strategies proposed for the creation of indigenous churches:

1. Indigenization: Foreign missionaries create well-organized churches and then hand them over to local converts. The foreign mission is generally seen as a scaffolding which must be removed once the fellowship of believers is functioning properly. Missionaries provide teaching, pastoral care, sacraments, buildings, finance and authority, and train local converts to take over these responsibilities. Thus the church becomes indigenous. It becomes self-supporting, self-propagating and self-governing.
2. Indigeneity: Foreign missionaries do not create churches, but simply help local converts develop their own spiritual gifts and leadership abilities and gradually develop their own churches. Missionaries provide teaching and pastoral care alone. The church is thus indigenous from the start. It has always been self-supporting, self-propagating and self-governing.

== Proponents ==
=== Nineteenth century ===
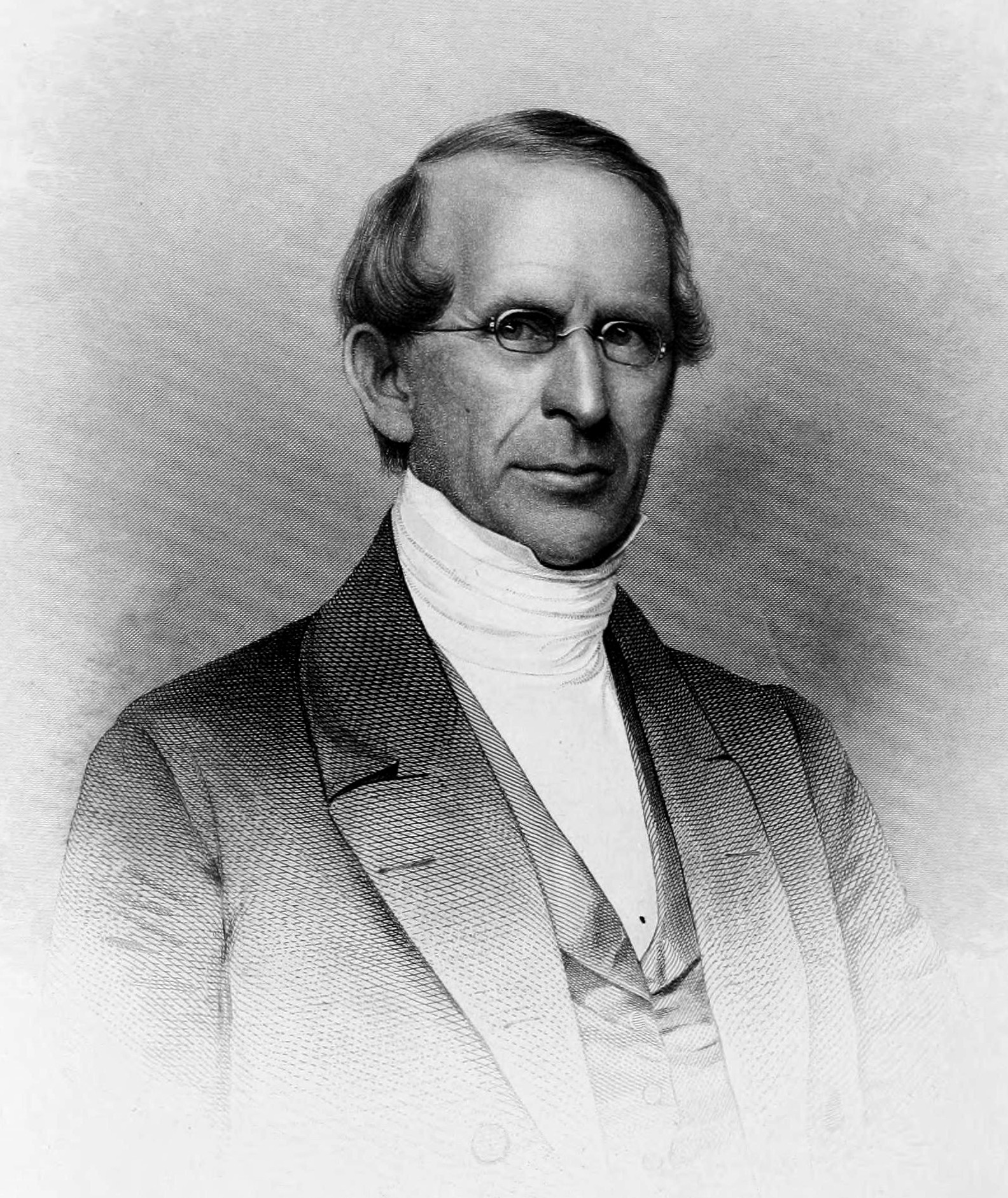
Rufus Anderson

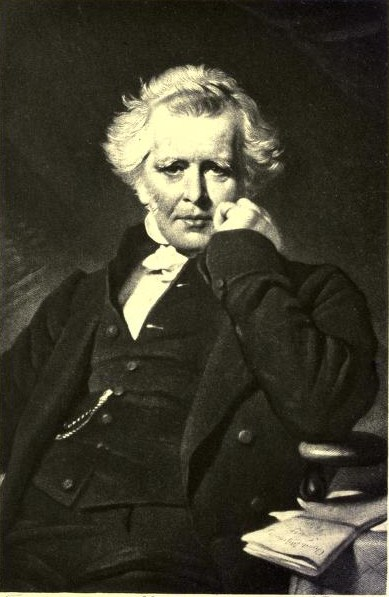
Henry Venn

Henry Venn (Anglican, Church Missionary Society) (1796–1873) and Rufus Anderson (Congregationalist, American Board) (1796–1880) simultaneously developed a strategy of Indigenization in response to the extreme paternalism exercised by western missionaries of the early 19th century, particularly in Asia. They perceived that "rice" Christians were completely dependent on missionaries and loyal to the church only as long as they were receiving free food. In exchange, missionaries expected complete loyalty from the "natives" and resisted giving up authority and control. The system was thought to foster an unhealthy parent–child relationship between the missionaries and national believers.

Anthony Norris Groves (1795–1853) attempted to avoid this problem in pioneer areas by guarding against any form of dependency from the start. He chose to represent no foreign denomination or missionary society, and he encouraged full co-operation between all Protestant missionaries for the encouragement of indigenous initiatives. He predated Roland Allen by eighty years as an advocate of Indigeneity rather than Indigenization. Looking directly to God for guidance and provision, he was a formative influence on Hudson Taylor and the "faith mission" movement, but the direct influence of his indigenous strategy is more evident in the remarkable movements associated with Bakht Singh in India and Watchman Nee in China. Nee, however, eschewed the label indigenous, saying that the organizing principle of a church was locality and not nationality, so that all believers in a given city were members of the church in that city regardless of national origin.

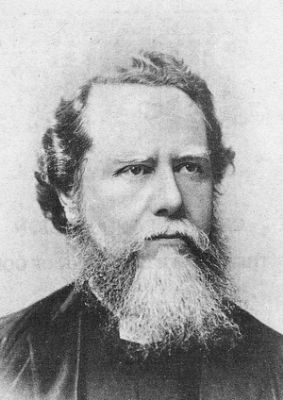
Hudson Taylor

John Ross (1848-1915), a Scottish missionary to Manchuria, established indigenous churches along the lines of the three-self principles among those of Korean descent beginning from 1874.

John Livingstone Nevius (1829–1893) served as a Presbyterian missionary to the Shandong province in China and later in Korea in the late 1800s. After questioning the methods of western missionaries of his time, he wrote a book published in 1886, The Planting and Development of Missionary Churches, which called for discarding old-style missions and the adoption of his new plan to foster independent, self-supporting local churches. He criticized the missionaries' practice of paying national workers out of mission funds, believing the healthy local church should be able to support its own local workers.

Hudson Taylor (1832–1905) was a Protestant missionary from England to China and founder of the China Inland Mission. He became disillusioned with other Protestant missionaries in China that lived in compounds and employed indigenous people as servants. Taylor subsequently learned local dialects, adopted local dress, and went up and down rivers in China preaching. He sought to distance himself from any paternal organizations or denominations in favour of "faith missions" which relied on the support of nationals and individuals. He also sought to train indigenous leaders to lead churches and mission stations in China, rather than have them run by foreigners.

Dixon Edward Hoste (1861–1946) succeeded Hudson Taylor as director of the China Inland Mission. Hoste is credited with making the Chinese churches apply the three-self principle of self-government, self-support, and self-propagation. This threefold motto was later adopted by the Three-Self Patriotic Movement after missionaries were expelled from China.

=== Twentieth century ===
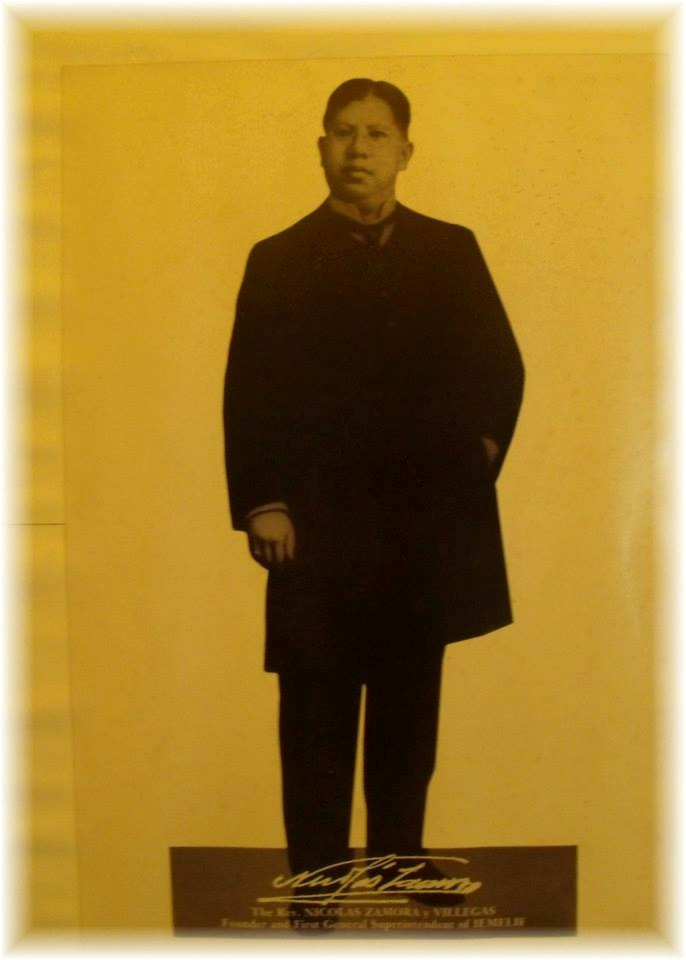
Nicolás Zamora

Roland Allen (1868–1947) also attempted to apply indigenous church principles to the missions of his day. After serving as an Anglican missionary in China from 1895 to 1903, he returned to England and spent 40 years writing about missions principles. Two of his books, Missionary Methods: St. Paul's or Ours? (1912) and The Spontaneous Expansion of the Church: And Causes that Hinder It, are still in print.

Alice Luce (1873–1955), first an Anglican missionary in India, and subsequently an Assemblies of God missionary among Hispanics along the US–Mexico border, was influenced by Allen's theory of missions and in 1921 she wrote a series of articles, "Paul's Missionary Methods", for the Pentecostal Evangel. Due to her advocacy, indigenous church principles became normative for Assemblies of God missions during the early part of the 20th century.

Nicolás Zamora (1875–1914) founded on 28 February 1909 the first Indigenous Evangelical Church in the Philippines. Behind the founding of the IEMELIF, nationalist and subsequent independence movements. Filipinos wanted full autonomy, including in the realm of religion, as the 333 years of Spanish rule were marked by the Catholic Church's control over both temporal and spiritual affairs. His vision and motivation was faith in God's providence, and belief that the Filipino was capable of erecting a self-sustaining, autonomous, and self-propagating evangelical church. In 1903, he was assigned to be a pastor at Knox Memorial Church becoming the first Filipino Protestant pastor. Zamora took up law at the University of Santo Tomas where he honed his skills in debate and oration, then entered a seminary in Shanghai.

Many speakers at the 1910 World Missionary Conference in Edinburgh emphasized indigenization of churches raised up by mission work, including the lone native Chinese attendee, Cheng Jingyi, who later became the general secretary of the National Christian Council of China and the first moderator of the Church of Christ in China.

John Wesley Haley (1878–1951), Free Methodist Church in Canada missionary to South Africa 1902–1909, 1917–1934, and Ruanda-Urundi 1934–1946. Haley left South Africa after several decades of ministry disillusioned with traditional mission practice and initiated new ministry in Burundi following the indigenous mission approach, involving Burundian converts in the leadership, decision-making process "from the beginning". He felt a special kinship with the work of Nevius and Allen, despite limited understanding from his mission board.

Melvin Hodges (1909–1988), an Assemblies of God missionary to Nicaragua, again popularized the idea in the 1950s with his book, On the Mission Field: The Indigenous Church. He defined the indigenous church as "a native church ... which shares the life of the country in which it is planted and finds itself ready to govern itself, support itself, and reproduce itself." Hodges believed that foreign money creates dependence and establishes paternalistic patterns within mission movements, leading to an unhealthy, anemic church. His experience as a missionary no doubt influenced his presentation of the three-self principle. He emphasized the need for flexibility and tailoring the principles to fit the need of the local believers.

In his book Transforming Mission, David Bosch (1929–1992), a Dutch Reformed Afrikaner missiologist, echoed Paul G. Hiebert's suggestion that a fourth "self" needed to be added to the Venn–Anderson framework: "self-theologizing". Though much self-theologizing had already taken place in mission churches, much of it has been left unnoticed or considered syncretistic. Bosch suggested that in order to not fall into the two extremes of syncretism or "Babylonian captivity", self-theologizing must be in dialogue with the universal invisible church. Only then would a truly indigenous church exist.

== See also ==
- Catholic Church and the Age of Discovery
- Christian mission
- Timeline of Christian missions
