= Yelling, Cambridgeshire =

Village in Cambridgeshire, England

Coordinates: 52.25°N 0.16°W

Yelling
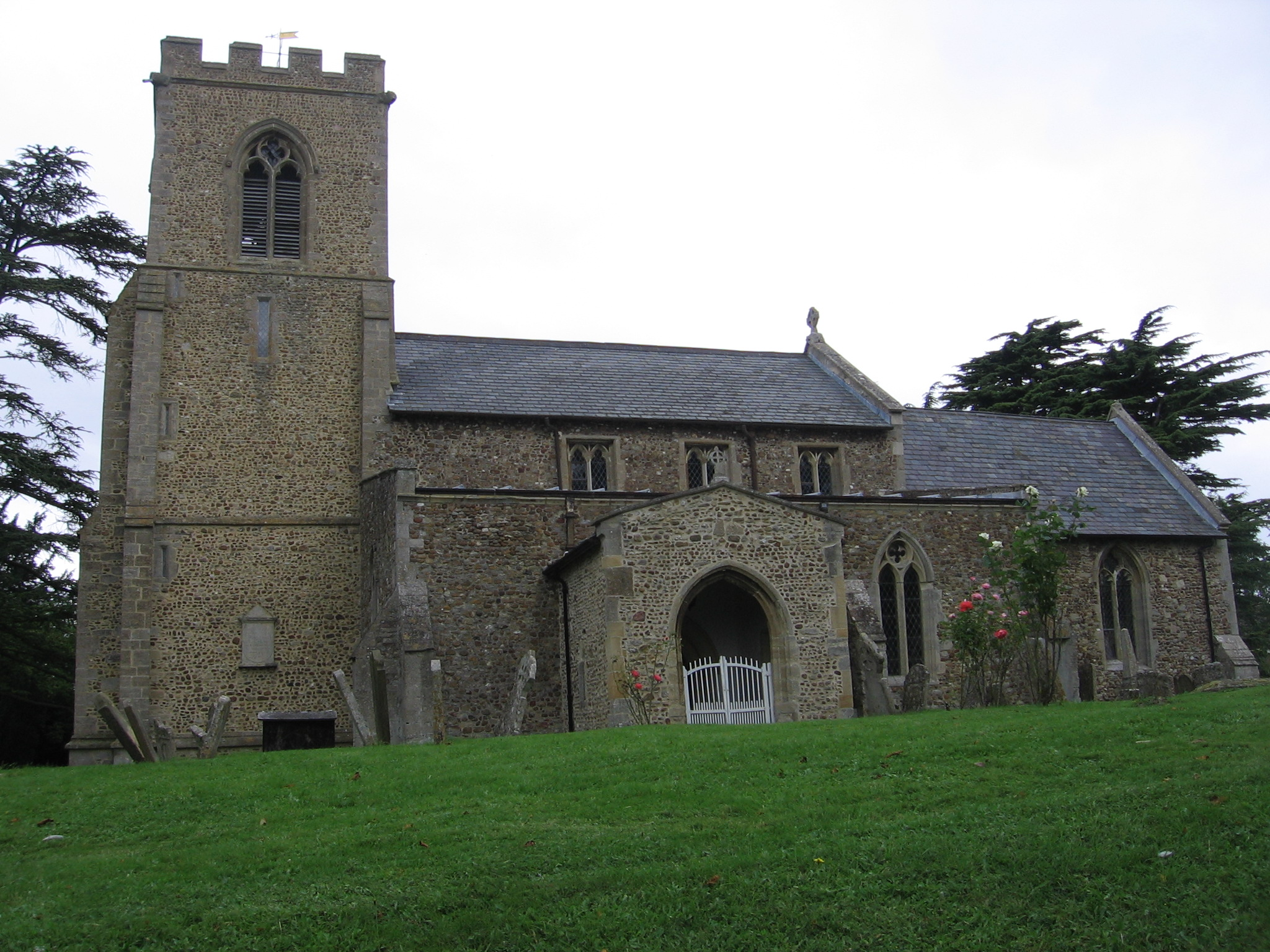
- Holy Cross Church, Yelling

- Location within Cambridgeshire
- Population: 300 (2011 Census)
- OS grid reference: TL260625
- District: Huntingdonshire
- Shire county: Cambridgeshire
- Region: East
- Country: England
- Sovereign state: United Kingdom
- Post town: St Neots
- Postcode district: PE19
- Dialling code: 01480
- Police: Cambridgeshire
- Fire: Cambridgeshire
- Ambulance: East of England
- UK Parliament: Huntingdon
- Website: Welcome to Yelling Village Website

Yelling is a linear village and civil parish in the Huntingdonshire administrative district of Cambridgeshire, England. The village is about 5 miles (8 km) east of St Neots and 6 miles (10 km) south of Huntingdon.

== History ==
Yelling is in the former county of Huntingdonshire. Its toponym has had various spellings in recorded history, including Gellinge (11th century), Gylling (12th–15th century) and Illyng (16th century). The name is thought to be derived from the manorial family Gill or Gell. The village was listed as Gelinge, Gellinge and Ghellinge in the Domesday Book of 1086 in the Hundred of Toseland in Huntingdonshire. In 1086 there were two manors at Yelling and 25 households.

In 1932 the village was noted for its 17th-century houses and cottages, many of which are in the High Street. Church Farmhouse is a red-brick 17th-century house with a double-pile plan. The Old Forge is a 17th-century timber-framed house.

== Government ==
For Yelling the highest tier of local government is Cambridgeshire County Council.

Yelling is part of the electoral ward of Buckden, Gransden and The Offords, which is represented on the county council by one councillor. The second tier of local government is Huntingdonshire District Council, a non-metropolitan district of Cambridgeshire. Yelling is a part of the district ward of Gransden and The Offords, which is represented on the district council by two councillors. As a civil parish, Yelling has a parish council.

Yelling was in the historic and administrative county of Huntingdonshire until 1965. From 1965 the village was part of the new administrative county of Huntingdon and Peterborough. Then in 1974, after the Local Government Act 1972, Yelling became a part of the county of Cambridgeshire.

Yelling is in the parliamentary constituency of Huntingdon, and has been represented since 2024 in the House of Commons by Ben Obese-Jecty (Conservative).

== Demography ==
High Street, Yelling

=== Population ===
From 1801 to 1901 the population of Yelling was recorded every ten years by the UK census. In that time the population was in the range of 242 (the lowest was in 1901) and 414 (the highest was in 1861).

From 1901, a census was taken every ten years with the exception of 1941 (due to the Second World War).

Parish	1911	1921	1931	1951	1961	1971	1981	1991	2001	2011
Yelling	246	225	193	220	231	249	269	259	299	300

All population census figures from report Historic Census figures Cambridgeshire to 2011 by Cambridgeshire Insight.

In 2011, the parish covered an area of 1,846 acres (747 hectares) and the population density of Yelling in 2011 was 104 persons per square mile (40.2 per square kilometre).

== Church and chapel ==
=== Parish church ===
The Domesday Book of 1086 records a church in Yelling, but the oldest part of the present Church of England parish church of the Holy Cross is the north arcade, which was built around 1180–90. The south aisle includes two original 13th-century windows. The clerestory, south porch and west tower were built in the 14th century. There is a Mass dial on the southeast buttress of the south aisle.

The west tower has a ring of four bells. Christopher Graye of Haddenham cast the treble and second bell in 1666. Joseph Eayre of St Neot's cast the tenor bell in 1739 and the second bell in 1770. The bells are currently unringable.

Holy Cross is a Grade II* listed building.

The noted evangelist Henry Venn was Vicar of Yelling from 1771 until his death in 1797.

=== Baptist chapel ===
The village has a Baptist chapel, established in 1850. In 2016 there was a planning application on the notice board outside the chapel for it to be converted into a private home.

== Bibliography ==
- Page, WH; Proby, Granville; Ladds, S Inskip, eds. (1932). "Yelling". A History of the County of Huntingdon. Victoria County History. Vol. II. London: St Catherine Press. pp. 379–383.
- Pevsner, Nikolaus (1968). Bedfordshire and the County of Huntingdon and Peterborough. The Buildings of England. Harmondsworth: Penguin Books. p. 372. ISBN 0-14-0710-34-5.
- Williams, Ann; Martin, GH, eds. (1992). Domesday Book: A Complete Translation. London: Penguin Books. p. 1430. ISBN 0-141-00523-8.
