= Clapham Sect =

Group of Church of England social reformers

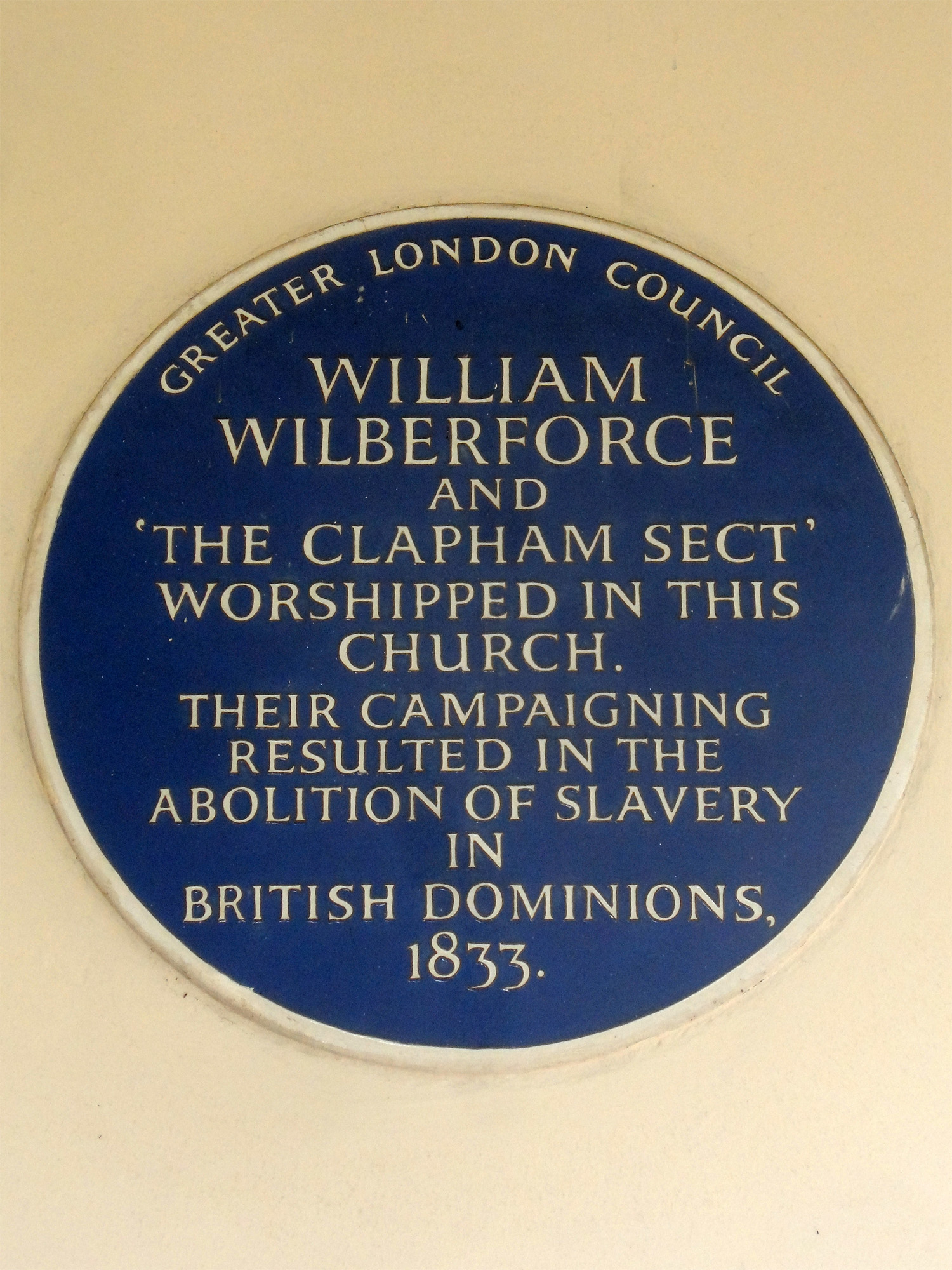
Blue plaque commemorating William Wilberforce and the Clapham Sect

The Clapham Sect, or Clapham Saints, were a group of social reformers associated with Holy Trinity Clapham in the period from the 1780s to the 1840s. Despite the label "sect", most members remained in the established (and dominant) Church of England, which was highly interwoven with offices of state.

== History ==
The Clapham movement grew from 18th-century evangelical trends in the Church of England (the Anglican Church) and started to coalesce around residents of Clapham, especially during the rectorship there of John Venn (in office: 1792-1813) and came to engage in systematically advocating social reform.

The sect played leading roles in the abolitionist movement in Britain, advocating for the end of the transatlantic slave trade and, ultimately, the abolition of slavery within the British Empire. After years of sustained campaigning, Parliament passed the Slave Trade Act in 1807, outlawing the trade throughout the British Empire, and later the Slavery Abolition Act in 1833, which ended the institution of slavery itself.

Members helped found organisations such as the Church Missionary Society in 1799, the British and Foreign Bible Society, and other allied institutions aimed at both domestic and overseas evangelism. The group also financed schools and publications, including The Christian Observer, which spread evangelical viewpoints.

In the course of time the growth of evangelical Christian revivalism in England and the movement for Catholic emancipation fed into a waning of the old precept that every Englishman automatically counted as an Anglican. Some new Christian groups (such as the Methodists and the Plymouth Brethren) moved away from Anglicanism, and the Christian social reformers who succeeded the Claphamites from about the 1830s often exemplified Nonconformist conscience and identified with groups functioning outside the established Anglican Church.

== Summary and context ==
These were reformists and abolitionists, being contemporary terms as the 'Sect' was – until 1844 – unnamed. They figured and heard readings, sermons and lessons from prominent and wealthy Evangelical Anglicans who called for the liberation of slaves, abolition of the slave trade and the reform of the penal system, and recognised and advocated other cornerstone civil-political rights and socio-economic rights. Defying the status quo of labour exploitation and consequent vested interests in the legislature was laborious and was motivated by their Christian faith and concern for social justice and fairness for all human beings. Their most famous member was William Wilberforce, widely commemorated in monuments and credited with hastening the end of the slave trade.

Electoral and other political rights were a main cause of all Radicals then their Northern successors the Chartists, their shared earliest success being the Great Reform Act 1832. Many of the other key rights saw a comparative context in treatises of the Age of Enlightenment, and Age of Revolutions. France's 1789 Declaration of the Rights of Man and of the Citizen, together with the 1689 English Bill of Rights, the 1776 United States Declaration of Independence, and the 1789 United States Bill of Rights, inspired, in large part, the 1948 United Nations Universal Declaration of Human Rights.

== Campaigns and successes ==
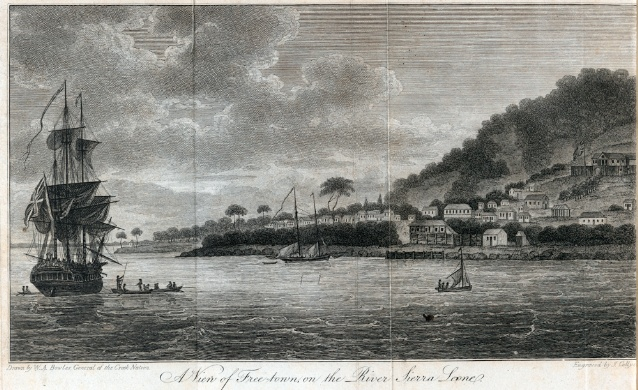
Freetown, the capital of Sierra Leone, in 1803

The name stems from most of its figures being parishioners of Clapham, then a village south of London (today part of south-west London), where Wilberforce and Thornton, its two most influential leaders, often lived and met. Liturgy, sermons and sometimes meetings at Holy Trinity Church on Clapham Common were a central feature, largely neighboured by upmarket new homes and expensive single-home plots of land (fashionable villas in the terms of the time).

Henry Venn, since seen as the founder, was lesser clergy, Curate, there (from at least 1754) and his son John became rector (parish priest) (1792–1813). The House of Commons politicians (MPs) William Wilberforce (first elected 1780) and Henry Thornton (first elected 1782), two of the most influential of the sect were parishioners and many of the meetings were held in their houses. They were encouraged by Beilby Porteus, the Bishop of London, himself an abolitionist and reformer, who sympathised with many of their aims. The term "Clapham Sect" is an almost non-contemporaneous invention by James Stephen in an article of 1844 which celebrated and romanticised the work of these reformers.

The reformers included members from St Edmund Hall, Oxford and Magdalene College, Cambridge, where the Vicar of Holy Trinity Church, Charles Simeon had preached to students from the university, some of whom underwent an evangelical conversion experience and later became associated with the Clapham Sect.

Lampooned in their day as "the saints", the group published a journal, the Christian Observer, edited by Zachary Macaulay and were also credited with the foundation of several missionary and tract societies, including the British and Foreign Bible Society and the Church Missionary Society.

After many decades of work both in British society and in Parliament, the reformers saw their efforts rewarded with the final passage of the Slave Trade Act 1807, banning the trade throughout the British Empire and, after many further years of campaigning, the total emancipation of British slaves with the passing of the Slavery Abolition Act 1833. They also campaigned vigorously for Britain to use its influence to work towards abolishing slavery throughout the world.

Some of the group, Granville Sharp, Thomas Clarkson and William Wilberforce, were responsible for the founding in 1787 of Sierra Leone as a settlement for some of the African-Americans freed by the British during the American Revolutionary War; it thus became the first non trading-post British "colony" akin to a fledgling mission state in Africa, whose purpose in Clarkson's words was "the abolition of the slave trade, the civilisation of Africa, and the introduction of the gospel there". Later, in 1792, another of the group John Clarkson was instrumental in the creation of its capital Freetown.

The group are described by the historian Stephen Tomkins as "a network of friends and families in England, with William Wilberforce as its centre of gravity, who were powerfully bound together by their shared moral and spiritual values, by their religious mission and social activism, by their love for each other, and by marriage".

By 1848 when evangelical bishop John Bird Sumner became Archbishop of Canterbury, it is said that between a quarter and a third of Anglican clergy were linked to the movement, which by then had diversified greatly in its goals, although they were no longer considered an organised faction.

Members of the group founded or were involved with a number of other societies, including the Abolition Society, formally known as the Society for Effecting the Abolition of the Slave Trade (founded by Clarkson, Sharp and others) and run largely by white middle-class women of Quaker, Unitarian and Evangelical faiths. The Society for the Mitigation and Gradual Abolition of Slavery Throughout the British Dominions followed in 1823. There was also the Proclamation Society, the Sunday School Society, the Bettering Society, and the Small Debt Society.

The Clapham Sect have been credited with playing a significant part in the development of Victorian morality, through their writings, their societies, their influence in Parliament, and their example in philanthropy and moral campaigns, especially against slavery. In the words of Tomkins, "The ethos of Clapham became the spirit of the age."

== Members ==
Members of the Clapham Sect, and those associated with them, included:

- Thomas Fowell Buxton (1786–1845), leader of the movement for the abolition of slavery, MP for Weymouth and Melcombe Regis and brewer
- William Dealtry (1775–1847), Rector of Holy Trinity Church, Clapham, mathematician
- Edward James Eliot (1758–97), MP for St Germans and Liskeard
- Samuel Gardiner (1755-1827) and his wife Mary Boddam of Coombe Lodge, Whitchurch-on-Thames
- Thomas Gisborne (1758–1846), Prebendary of Durham Cathedral and author
- Charles Grant (1746–1823), administrator, chairman of the directors of the British East India Company, father of the first Lord Glenelg
- Zachary Macaulay (1768–1838), estate manager, governor of Sierra Leone, father of Thomas Babington Macaulay
- Hannah More (1745–1833), bluestocking, playwright, religious writer and philanthropist
- Granville Sharp (1735–1813), campaigner for social justice, scholar and administrator
- Charles Simeon (1759–1836), Anglican cleric, minister of Holy Trinity Church, Cambridge, promoter of missions
- William Smith (1756–1835), MP for Sudbury and Norwich
- James Stephen (1758–1832), Master of Chancery, great-grandfather of Virginia Woolf
- James Stephen (civil servant) Under-Secretary of State for the Colonies (1789-1859)
- Lord Teignmouth (1751–1834), Governor-general of India
- John Thornton (1720-1790), prominent Clapham resident, philanthropist and founder member of the group
- Henry Thornton (1760–1815), economist, banker, philanthropist, Member of Parliament (MP) for Southwark, son of John Thornton and great-grandfather of writer E.M. Forster
- Marianne Thornton (1797-1887), daughter of Henry Thornton
- Henry Venn (1725–97), curate of Holy Trinity Church, Clapham, and founder of the group, father of John Venn (priest) and great-grandfather of John Venn (originator of the Venn diagram)
- John Venn (1759–1813), Rector of Holy Trinity Church, Clapham
- William Wilberforce (1759–1833), MP for Kingston upon Hull, Yorkshire and Bramber, abolitionist, and leader of the campaign against the slave trade

== See also ==
- List of abolitionist forerunners
- Testonites
