= John Venn (priest) =

Anglican Clergyman and Leading member of the Clapham Sect

John Venn (9 March 1759 – 1 July 1813) was a priest of the Church of England who was a central figure of the group of religious philanthropists known as the Clapham Sect.

== Life ==
He was born at Clapham to the south-west of central London, while his father Henry Venn was curate there, on 9 March 1759. He entered Sidney Sussex College, Cambridge, graduated B.A. in 1781, and M.A. in 1784.

Venn was rector of Little Dunham, Norfolk, from 1783 to 1792, and rector of Holy Trinity Church, Clapham from 1792 until his death. He was one of the founders of the Church Missionary Society in 1797, and was a leading abolitionist and philanthropist. These evangelistic and humanitarian interests brought him into close association with abolitionists such as William Wilberforce and Granville Sharp. He ran the school set up by the Society for the Education of Africans which was set up in Clapham in 1799. He died at Clapham on 1 July 1813. A volume of his sermons was published after his death.

Some of his friends arranged for the following memorial plaque to be erected on the north side of the church in Clapham:

"To the memory of the Reverend John Venn, M.A. for twenty years Rector of this parish. He was the son of the Reverend Henry Venn, Vicar of Yelling; and his progenitors, for several generations, were Ministers of the Church of England. He was endowed by providence with a sound and powerful understanding: and he added to an ample fund of classical knowledge a familiar acquaintance with all the more useful parts of philosophy and science: His taste was simple. His disposition was humble and benevolent. His manners were mild and conciliating. As a Divine, he was comprehensive and elevated in his views, and peculiarly conversant with Theological subjects; but he derived his chief knowledge from the scriptures themselves, which he diligently studied and faithfully interpreted. As a Preacher, he was affectionate and persuasive, intellectual and discriminating, serious, solemn, and devout; anxious to impress on others those evangelical truths which he himself so deeply felt. By his Family, among whom he was singularly beloved, his remembrance will be cherished with peculiar tenderness. Having been sustained, during a long and trying illness, by a stedfast faith in that Saviour whom in all his preaching he laboured to exalt, he died 1 July 1813, aged 54 years, leaving to his surviving family and flock an encouraging example of the blessedness of those who embrace with their whole hearts the religion of Jesus Christ."

John is remembered (with Henry and Henry the younger) in the Church of England with a commemoration on 1 July.

== Family ==
Venn married first, at Trinity Church, Hull, on 22 October 1789, Catherine (1760–1803), (Note: Sometimes spelled Catherine) only daughter of William King, merchant, of Kingston upon Hull. By her he had sons Henry Venn, and John, for many years vicar of St. Peter's, Hereford; also five daughters, of whom Jane, the second, married James Stephen, and was mother of James Fitzjames Stephen and Leslie Stephen; and Caroline married Stephen Ellis Batten and was mother of Emelia Russell Gurney. He married, secondly, on 25 August 1812, Frances, daughter of John Turton of Clapham.

Venn was the father of Henry Venn (1796-1873), honorary secretary of the Church Missionary Society, and grandfather of logician and philosopher John Venn, who compiled a family history in 1904.

== Bibliography ==
- Michael M. Hennell, John Venn and the Clapham Sect (London: Lutterworth Press, 2003). ISBN 97807 18890261.
- Nigel A. D. Scotland, Evangelical Anglicans in a Revolutionary Age 1789-1901 (Carlisle, Cumbria: Paternoster Press, 2004). ISBN 1-84227-231-4
- Stephen Tomkins, The Clapham Sect: How Wilberforce's Circle Transformed Britain (Oxford: LionHudson, 2010). ISBN 978 0 7459 5306 9.
- Rev. John Venn, Sermons, 2 Vols (London: Ellerton and Henderson, 1814). Vol 1 and Vol 2.
- Venn, John (2012) [1904 Macmillan, London]. Annals of a Clerical Family: Being Some Account of the Family and Descendants of William Venn, Vicar of Otterton, Devon, 1600-1621. Cambridge University Press. ISBN 978-1-108-04492-9. also Internet archive (grandson)

Attribution

This article incorporates text from a publication now in the public domain: Lee, Sidney, ed. (1899). "Venn, Henry (1725-1797)". Dictionary of National Biography. Vol. 58. London: Smith, Elder & Co.
