= Henry Venn (Church Missionary Society) =

Missions strategist and clergyman

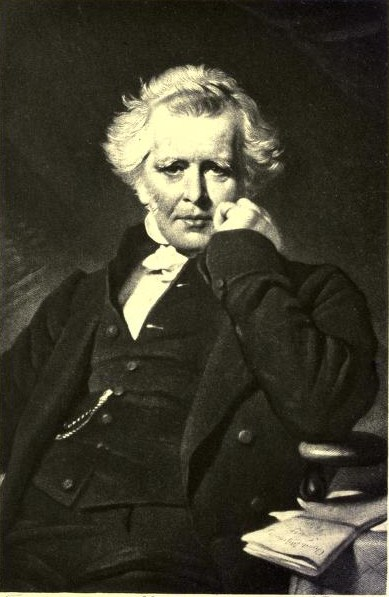
Henry Venn, from a mezzotint after George Richmond

Henry Venn (10 February 1796 – 13 January 1873) was an Anglican clergyman who is recognised as one of the foremost Protestant missions strategists of the nineteenth century. He was an outstanding administrator who served as honorary secretary of the Church Missionary Society from 1841 to 1873. He was also a campaigner, in the tradition of the Clapham Sect, who frequently lobbied Parliament on social issues of his day, notably on ensuring the total eradication of the Atlantic slave trade by retaining the West Africa Squadron of the Royal Navy. He expounded the basic principles of indigenous Christian missions: these were much later made widespread by the Lausanne Congress of 1974.

== Life ==
The son of John Venn, rector of Clapham, and grandson of Henry Venn, he was born at Clapham on 10 February 1796. He matriculated at Queens' College, Cambridge in 1814, graduated B.A. as nineteenth wrangler in 1818, and was elected a Fellow of his college in January 1819. He graduated M.A. in 1821 and B.D. in 1828. He was a close friend of Charles Simeon, a founder of the Church Missionary Society in 1799.

He was ordained a Church of England deacon in 1819, and priest in 1821, and soon afterwards took the curacy of St Dunstan-in-the-West. In practice it was a sole charge. He returned to Cambridge in 1824, where he was a lecturer, and then a tutor. He was proctor in 1825, and for a short time evening lecturer at Great St Mary's. In 1827 he was appointed by an old friend of his family, named Wilberforce, to be perpetual curate of Drypool, Kingston upon Hull. He resigned his fellowship in 1829 on his marriage. In 1834 he accepted the living of St John's, Upper Holloway, in the gift of Daniel Wilson who was then vicar of St Mary's Church, Islington, which he held for twelve years. He was appointed a prebendary of St Paul's Cathedral in 1846.

He resigned St John's in 1846, and devoted himself to the work of the Church Missionary Society. He acted as honorary secretary for thirty-two years, from 1841 to 1873. When he first undertook the work there were 107 European clergy employed by the Society, and nine who were local people. When he died in 1873 these numbers had risen to 230 and 148 respectively. During his tenure of office 498 clergymen were sent abroad, all of them passing under his inspection; with most of them he as secretary maintained a regular correspondence. He was involved in the establishment of eight or nine bishoprics for the superintendence of the missionary clergy, and was often consulted in the appointments made. Venn and Rufus Anderson of the American Board of Commissioners for Foreign Missions were the first to use the term "indigenous church" in the mid-nineteenth century. They wrote about the necessity for creating churches in the missions field that were self-supporting, self-governing, and self-propagating (Venn used the term "self-extending"). Venn is often quoted as encouraging the "euthanasia of missions," which meant that missionaries were to be considered temporary workers and not permanent.

With a view to checking the Atlantic slave trade on the west coast of Africa, Venn spent time in developing trade in African products. He had young Africans sent to England to learn methods of preparation of cotton, palm oil, and other articles of trade; and he paid visits to friends in Manchester in the cotton industry. In his later years his position as an evangelical in the Church of England was recognised by his being placed on two royal commissions.

Venn died at age 76, at Mortlake, Surrey, where he had resided for twelve years, on 13 January 1873, and was buried in the churchyard there. There was a portrait of him, by George Richmond, in the committee-room of the Church Missionary Society, and a marble relief in the crypt of St Paul's Cathedral. The memorial in St Paul's was erected in 1875 to the designs of Matthew Noble.

Henry is remembered (with Henry and John) in the Church of England with a commemoration on 1 July.

== Works ==
Venn published occasional sermons, and pamphlets on questions arising in his professional work. Among these were "Colonial Church Legislation", 1850; "Lord Langdale and the Gorham Judgment", 1853; "Retrospect and Prospect of the Operations of the Church Missionary Society", 1865. His only substantive works were the Life and Letters of Henry Venn (his grandfather), first published in 1834; and his Missionary Life of Xavier, 1866, an attempt to construct the life of Francis Xavier entirely from his own letters.

== Family ==
On 21 January 1829 he married Martha, fourth daughter of Nicholas Sykes of Swanland, near Hull. John Venn, the logician and philosopher, was their son.

== See also ==
- John Livingstone Nevius
- Three-Self Patriotic Movement
