= Kenton Couse =

English architect

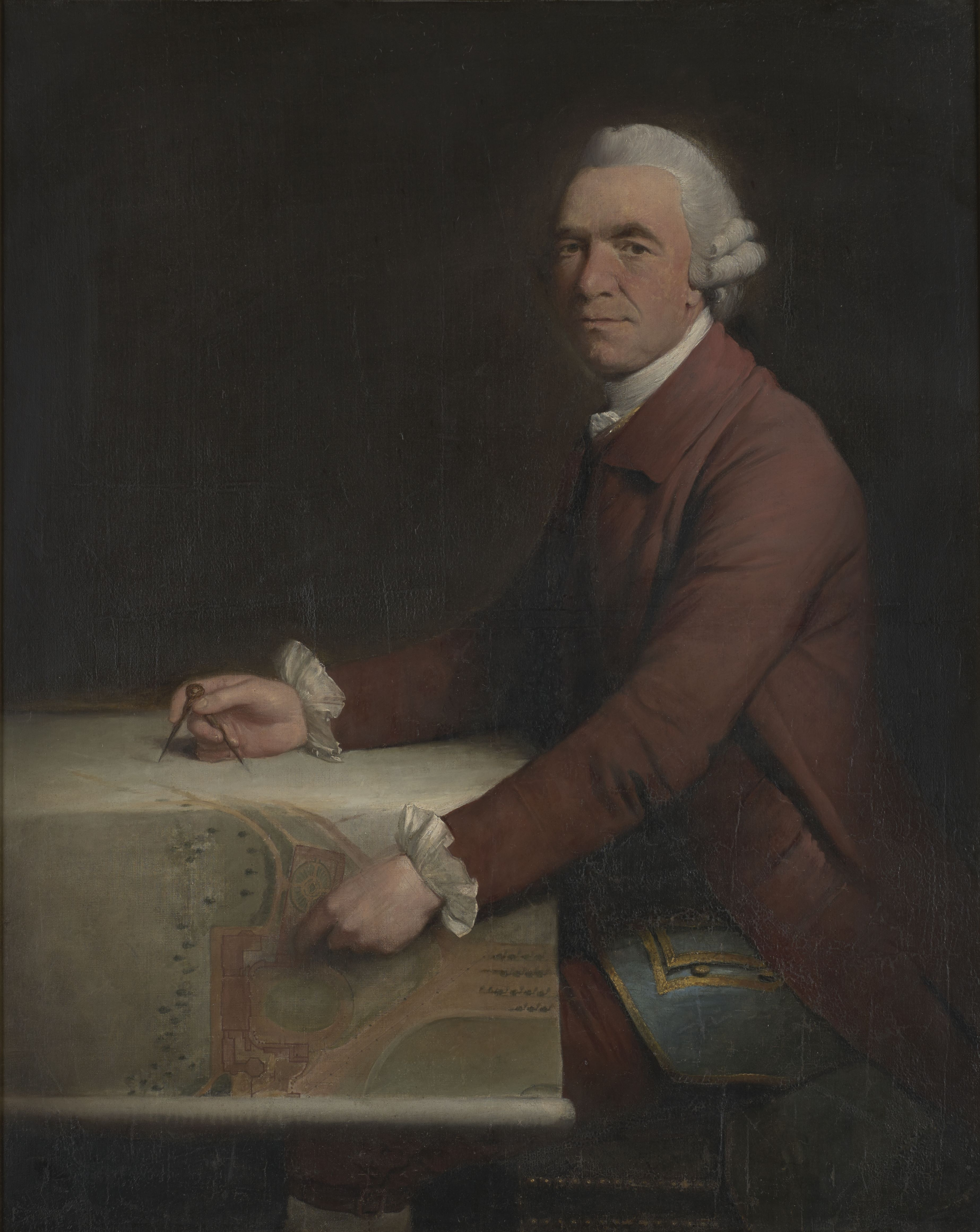
- Born: 1 March 1721; Bermondsey, London, England
- Died: 10 October 1790 (aged 69)
- Occupation: Architect
- Projects: 10 Downing Street; Richmond Bridge; Normanton Hall; Holy Trinity Church, Clapham

Kenton Couse (1 March 1721 – 10 October 1790) was an English architect. He was apprenticed to Henry Flitcroft whose patronage obtained him posts in the Office of Works. Couse subsequently became Secretary to the Board of Works from 1775 to 1782. His most famous work as an architect was a remodelling of 10 Downing Street from 1766 to 1775.

== Biography ==
Couse was born on 1 March 1721, the eldest son and only surviving child of Josias Couse (1693?–1755), a goldsmith and linen draper of Cheapside, London, and his wife, Margaret (1698–?), daughter of Alexander Kenton, master mariner.

In 1756, politician Charles Townshend ordered Couse to renovate the door of 10 Downing Street, resulting in an unassuming and narrow Georgian style doorway, consisting of a single white stone step leading to a modest brick front. It was probably not completed until 1772. Additionally he was co-designer of the Richmond Bridge, surveyor of Chertsey Bridge in Surrey, designer of the since demolished Normanton Hall in Rutland, and the architect of Holy Trinity Church, Clapham, which was consecrated in 1776.
