= John Livingston Nevius =

19th century American missionary in China

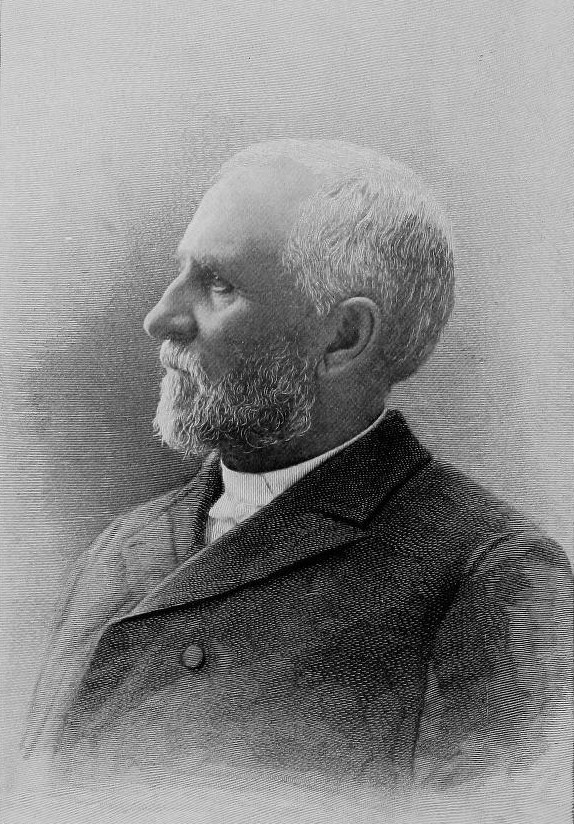
John Livingston Nevius

John Livingston Nevius (4 March 1829 – 19 October 1893) was an American Protestant missionary in China for forty years, appointed by the American Presbyterian Mission; his ideas on mission organization were also very important in the spread of the church in Korea. He wrote several books on the themes of Chinese religions, customs and social life, and missionary work.

== Biography ==
Nevius was born on a farm halfway between the villages of Lodi and Ovid in the "Lake country" of western New York state. His biography describes it as an idyllic country location in Lake Seneca, "gleaming through the trees", only 2 miles distant; he was the son of Benjamin Nevius, of Dutch descent, and his wife Mary Denton. He was educated at the college in Ovid, then at Union College in Schenectady, then, from 1850, at Princeton as a prospective minister in the Presbyterian Church.

In 1853, Nevius married Helen Coan and, on June 15 of that year, the couple set off, as missionaries, on a 6-month sea voyage to Ningbo, in the Zhejiang province on the southeast coast of China, arriving in the spring of 1854. He and his wife immediately set about learning the language, and Nevius's subsequent interest in the phenomenon of spirit possession was sparked off by conversations about the supernatural with his language tutor, Mr. Tu; the Chinese had a strong belief in the reality and power of the spirit world that was part of an animistic tradition in Chinese folk religion.

The Rev. Mr. and Mrs. Nevius were soon travelling and preaching, as well as setting up missions and schools, studying and writing. In 1861 the couple moved to Shandong province in North China, where most of their Chinese missionary work would be undertaken. They spent some time in Tongzhou and dispensed medicine to the locals during the 1862 cholera epidemic there. John also trained missionaries and helped to establish the country's first Synod which took place in Shanghai in 1870, while Mrs. Nevius set up a boarding school for girls.

In 1871, they moved to Yantai and built a house there called "Nan Lou". In 1873, John embarked on a taxing 600-mile missionary tour by foot, finding rest and sustenance at whatever establishments he could find along the way. In 1877, there was a famine in the province of Shantung (the "Great North China Famine"), and he played a pivotal role in raising funds, setting up a food distribution centre and organising a relief corps from quarters at Kao-Yai. Famine struck again in 1889, and Nevius's abilities were, once more, called upon.

Nevius continued with his missionary work to country areas until 1887, travelling thousands of miles, often under arduous conditions of terrain, weather etc. In 1890, he travelled to Korea and, although he stayed for only 2 weeks, his "Nevius Plan" (see below) was subsequently adopted and led to rapid growth of the church there. He died suddenly, at home, in October 1893, and was buried in the cemetery at Yantai.

Nevius was the author of several books covering the subjects of Chinese religions, spiritual practices and social and political life, spirit possession and missionary work; his wife also wrote an exhaustive biography (see bibliography).

Nevius wrote "Demon Possession" (also titled "Demon Possession and Allied Themes"), published 1894, in which he attests to several cases of demonic possession among the Chinese, and argues that demons exist, and that their instances are consistent with those in ancient and biblical scripture. He notes that Christian teaching is the most effective method of exorcism, and documents its performance by Christians of all denominations, and even non-believing Chinese. He argues, and analyses contemporary scientific literature, that demons are real in spiritual form. The possessed, he says, frequently show knowledge of scripture, rhymes or languages which the possessee is ignorant of; or display supernatural abilities. Both, he says, are evidence of genuine spiritual demonic possession.

== Indigenous Church Mission ==
After questioning the methods of western missionaries of his time, Nevius took up the Venn-Anderson principles of "self-propagation, self-government, and self-supporting" in a series of articles in the Chinese Recorder journal in 1885, which was later published as a book in 1886, The Planting and Development of Missionary Churches. Nevius called for discarding old-style missions and the adoption of his new plan to foster an independent, self-supporting local church. He criticized the missionaries' practice of paying national workers out of mission funds, believing the healthy local church should be able to support its own local workers.

== The Nevius Plan ==
The missionary principles formulated by Nevius later became known as the "Nevius Plan", and were a development of the existing ideas of Henry Venn and Rufus Anderson. When American Presbyterians began their work in Korea, the new missionaries invited Nevius to advise them. Embracing his method, the Korean mission enjoyed great success, although it did not gain similar popularity in China. The Nevius Plan outlined the following:

1. Christians should continue to live in their neighborhoods and pursue their occupations, being self-supporting and witnessing to their co-workers and neighbors.
2. Missions should only develop programs and institutions that the national church desired and could support.
3. The national churches should call out and support their own pastors.
4. Churches should be built in the native style with money and materials given by the church members.
5. Intensive biblical and doctrinal instruction should be provided for church leaders every year.

== See also ==
- Rufus Anderson
- Henry Venn

== Bibliography ==
- Helen Sanford Coan Nevius. Our Life in China (New York, R. Carter, 1869).
- Nevius, J. L. China and the Chinese (New York, Harper & brothers, 1869)
- Nevius, J. L. Demon possession and allied themes; being an inductive study of phenomena of our own times (Chicago: F. H. Revell, 1894).
- Helen Sanford Coan Nevius. The life of John Livingston Nevius: for forty years a missionary in China (New York; Chicago : Fleming H. Revell Co., 1895).
- Nevius, J. L. The planting and development of missionary churches (New York: Foreign mission library, 1899)
- Creegan, Charles Cole. Pioneer missionaries of the church (New York, American Tract Society, 1903).
- Nevius, J.L. "SAN-POH, or NORTH OF THE HILLS. A Narrative of Missionary Work in an Outstation in China" (Philadelphia : Presbyterian Board of Publication, 1869).
