= Henry Venn (Clapham Sect) =

English clergyman and writer (1725–1797)

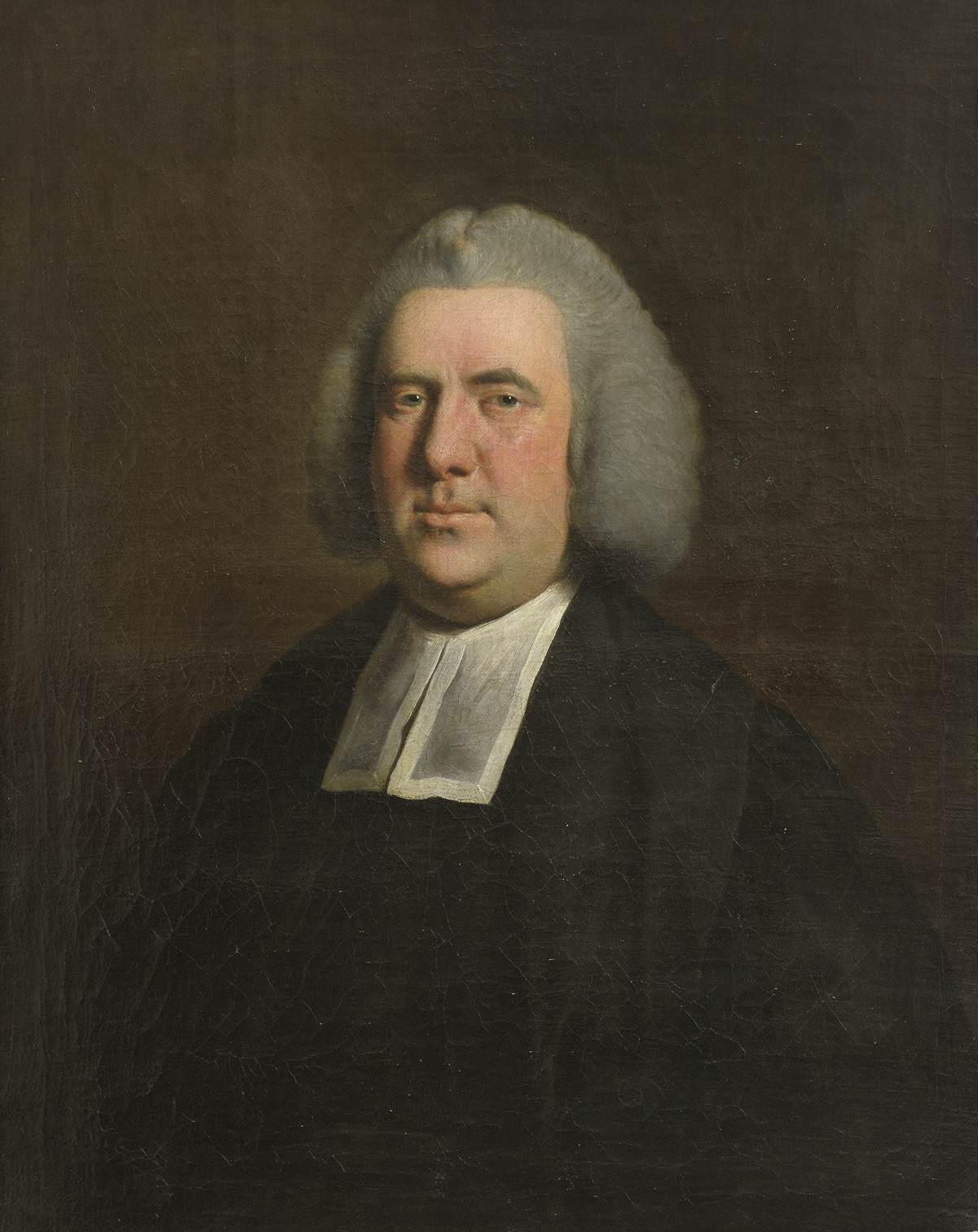
- 1770 portrait by Mason Chamberlin
- Born: 2 March 1724; Barnes, Surrey
- Died: 24 June 1797 (aged 73); Yelling, Huntingdonshire
- Occupations: Clergyman, writer
- Known for: Founder of the Clapham Sect

Henry Venn (2 March 1724 – 24 June 1797) was an English Anglican clergyman and writer who co-founded the Clapham Sect, an influential evangelical group within the Church of England.

== Life ==
He was the third son of Richard Venn, vicar of St Antholin, Budge Row in London. He was educated at the University of Cambridge from 1742, studying at St John's and then Jesus College where he was a Rustat scholar. He graduated B.A. in 1745 and M.A. in 1749. He played cricket at Cambridge until he was ordained in June 1747, and his biographer says he played in an England v Surrey match shortly beforehand. Venn was said to have been "a good batsman".

In 1749 Venn was ordained as a priest in the Church of England and was elected fellow of Queens' College, Cambridge. After holding a curacy at Barton, Cambridgeshire, he became curate of both St Matthew, Friday Street, in the City of London, and of West Horsley, Surrey, in 1750. Local clergy already considered him a Methodist (in later terms, an evangelical), since he taught Scripture in his home and the number of communicants at West Horsley increased from twelve to sixty. However, it was only at this time that his beliefs moved from the High Church views of The Whole Duty of Man to the more evangelical position of A Serious Call to a Devout and Holy Life. In 1754 he became curate of Clapham and was also elected lecturer of St Swithin, London Stone and St Alban, Wood Street.

From 1759 to 1771, Venn was vicar of Huddersfield Parish Church. He found a small group of like-minded Yorkshire clergy: Richard Conyers, William Grimshaw of Haworth, James Stillingfleet. In 1771 he exchanged to the living of Yelling, Huntingdonshire where he drew as visitors William Faris, Joseph Jowett, Thomas Robinson and Charles Simeon. He died in the rectory, and is commemorated by a plaque over the pulpit of the parish church.

Vann was chaplain to the Earl of Buchan.

Venn is remembered in the Church of England with a commemoration on 1 July.

== Works ==
Venn was well known as the author of The Compleat Duty of Man (London, 1763), a work in which he intended to supplement the teaching embodied in the anonymous The Whole Duty of Man from an evangelical perspective.

== Family ==
He married (1757) a daughter of the Rev. Thomas Bishop, D.D., a divine of Ipswich. Henry Venn's descendants also came to prominence over the succeeding generations. His son John Venn was one of the founders of the Church Missionary Society (CMS).

His granddaughter, by his eldest daughter Eling, was Charlotte Elliott, writer of numerous hymns, most notably '"Just as I Am". Her brothers were clergymen Edward Bishop Elliott and Henry Venn Elliott,

A grandson, also named Henry Venn (1796–1873), was honorary secretary of the Church Missionary Society from 1841 to 1873. He expounded the basic principles of indigenous Christian missions made widespread by the Lausanne Congress of 1974. A great-grandson was the logician and philosopher John Venn, famed for the Venn diagram.

== Bibliography ==
- Maun, Ian (2009). From Commons to Lord's, Volume One: 1700 to 1750. Cambridge: Roger Heavens. ISBN 978-19-00592-52-9.
