= Pentecostal Evangel =

Assemblies of God Periodical (1913-2014)

- Categories: Christianity, Christian news
- Founded: 1913
- Final issue: 2014 (print)
- Company: General Council of the Assemblies of God in the United States of America
- Country: United States
- Based in: Springfield, Missouri
- Language: English
- Website: www.pe.ag.org/index.cfm

Pentecostal Evangel was the official weekly magazine of the General Council of the Assemblies of God in the United States of America, with an average weekly circulation of approximately 200,000 worldwide. The weekly published inspirational features that focused on contemporary issues, biblical instruction and devotional guides, Christian news, and conversation pieces. The magazine's headquarters was located in Springfield, Missouri.

== History ==
Pentecostal Evangel was first published in 1913 as The Christian Evangel, one year before the formation of the Assemblies of God. Founders J. Roswell and Alice Flower created The Christian Evangel to report on revivals and missions activities.

From June 2002 to July 2009, the magazine was renamed Today's Pentecostal Evangel. It was also called The Weekly Evangel from 1915 to 1919, coinciding with the General Council locating its headquarters in St. Louis, Missouri. The name Christian Evangel returned when the headquarters moved to Springfield, Missouri, its current location.

In November 2014, the magazine announced that it would discontinue its printed publication at the end of the year, and switch to an online version at penews.org.

== Facts and statistics ==
Since 1997, the Evangel:

- Received reports from more than 18,000 individuals making commitments to Jesus through reading the Evangel
- Established Pentecostal Evangel Books (1999), which has released six titles since its founding

Pentecostal Evangel published its 5,000th edition on March 7, 2010.

Nine times each year, the Evangel collaborated with the Assemblies of God World Missions Department to devote an entire issue to world missions coverage. Through its World Missions Edition, readers receive a perspective and news on the fellowship's world missions efforts. (The World Missions Edition, replaced a separate magazine, Mountain Movers, which focused solely on missions.)

== See also ==
- Assembly of God
