= John Venn =

English logician and philosopher (1834–1923)

John Venn FRS FSA
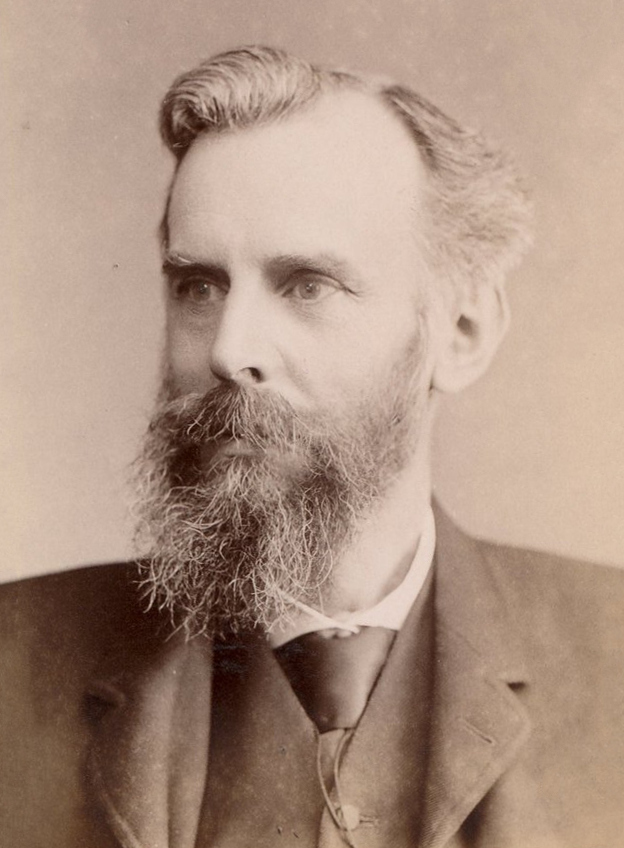
- Born: 4 August 1834; Kingston upon Hull, Yorkshire, England
- Died: 4 April 1923 (aged 88); Cambridge, England
- Education: Gonville and Caius College, Cambridge
- Known for: Frequentist probability; Reference class problem; Venn diagram
- Awards: Fellow of the Royal Society (1883)
- Scientific career
- Fields: Mathematics; Logic; Philosophy
- Workplaces: Gonville and Caius College, Cambridge

Signature
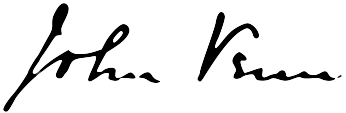

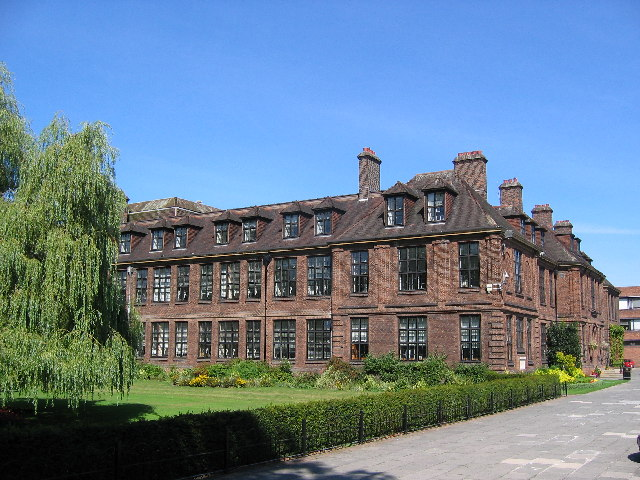
The Venn Building, University of Hull

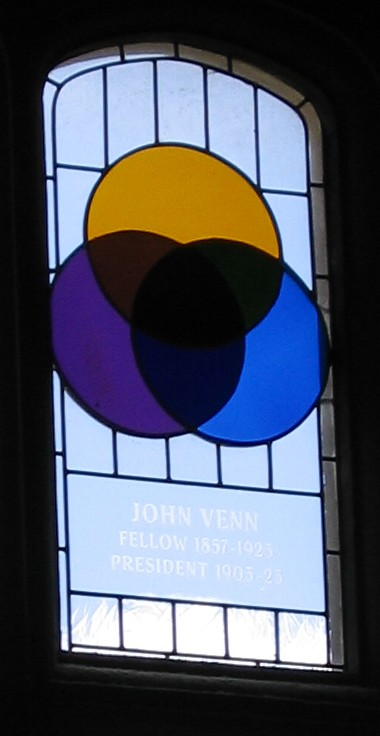
Stained glass window at Gonville and Caius College, Cambridge, commemorating Venn and the Venn diagram

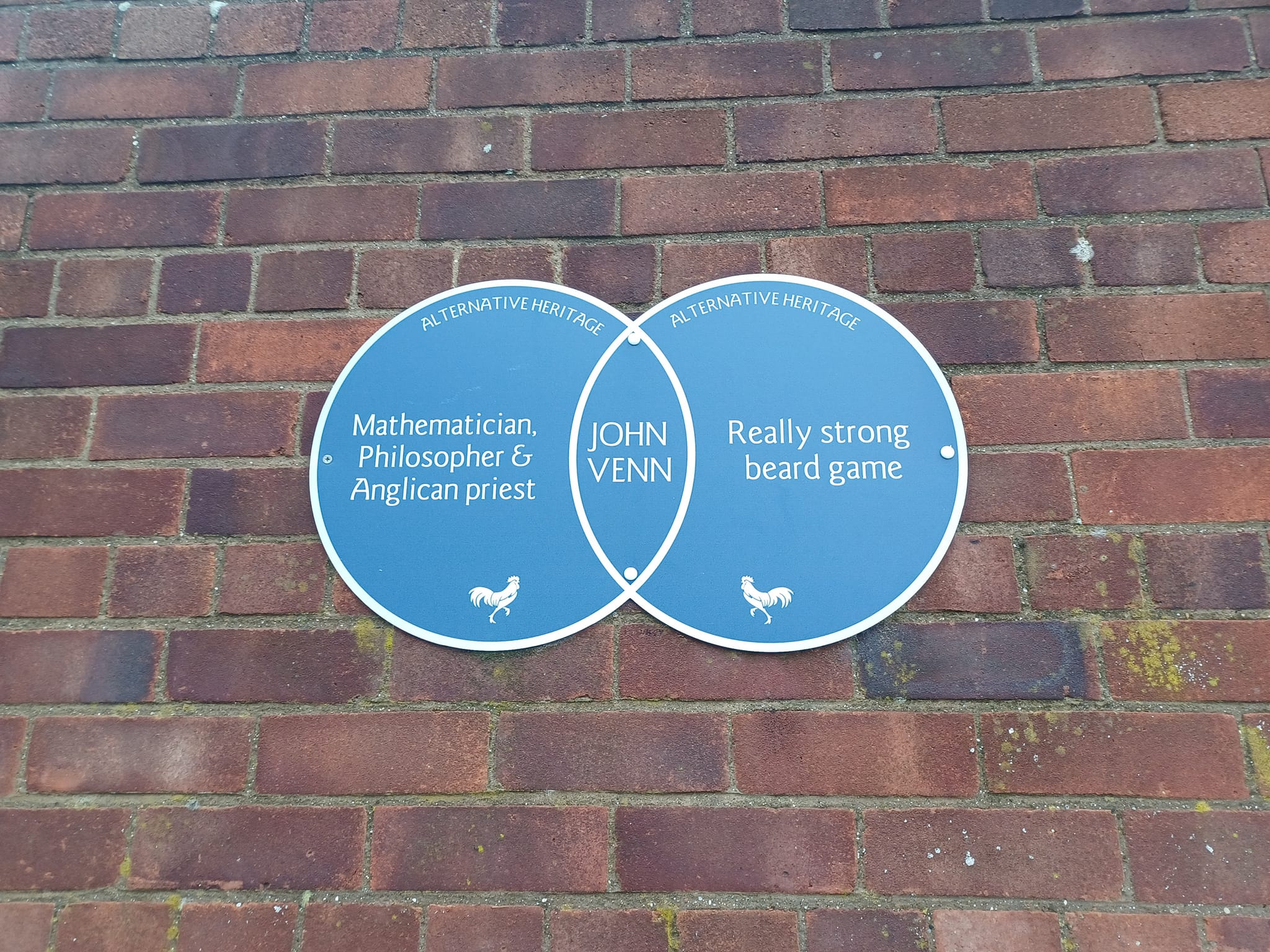
Alternative Heritage plaque for John Venn in Hull

John Venn, FRS, FSA (4 August 1834 – 4 April 1923) was an English mathematician, logician and philosopher noted for introducing Venn diagrams, which are used in logic, set theory, probability, statistics, and computer science. In 1866, Venn published The Logic of Chance, a groundbreaking book which espoused the frequency theory of probability, arguing that probability should be determined by how often something is forecast to occur as opposed to "educated" assumptions. Venn then further developed George Boole's theories in the 1881 work Symbolic Logic, where he highlighted what would become known as Venn diagrams.

== Early life ==
John Venn was born on 4 August 1834 in Kingston upon Hull, Yorkshire, to Martha Sykes and Rev. Henry Venn, who was the rector of the parish of Drypool. His mother died when he was three years old. Venn was descended from a long line of church evangelicals, including his grandfather John Venn. Venn was brought up in a very strict atmosphere at home. His father Henry had played a significant part in the Evangelical movement and he was also the secretary of the Society for Missions to Africa and the East, establishing eight bishoprics overseas. His grandfather was pastor to William Wilberforce of the abolitionist movement, in Clapham.

He began his education in London joining Sir Roger Cholmeley's School, now known as Highgate School, with his brother Henry in September 1879. He moved on to Islington Proprietary School.

== University life and career ==
In October 1853, he went to Gonville and Caius College, Cambridge. He found the Mathematical Tripos unsuited to his mathematical style, complaining that the handful of private tutors he worked with "always had the Tripos prominently in view". In contrast, Venn wished to investigate interesting ideas beyond the syllabus. Nonetheless, he was Sixth Wrangler upon sitting the exams in January 1857.

Venn experienced, in his words, a "reaction and disgust" to the Tripos which led him to sell his books on mathematics and state that he would never return to the subject. Following his family vocation, he was ordained as an Anglican priest in 1859, serving first at the church in Cheshunt, Hertfordshire, and later in Mortlake, Surrey.

In 1862, he returned to Cambridge as a lecturer in moral science, studying and teaching political economy, philosophy, probability theory and logic. He reacquainted himself with logic and became a leading scholar in the field through his textbooks The Logic of Chance (1866), Symbolic Logic (1881) and The Principles of Empirical or Inductive Logic (1889). His academic writing was influenced by his teaching: he saw Venn diagrams, which he called "Eulerian Circles" and introduced in 1880, as a pedagogical tool. Venn was known for teaching students across multiple Cambridge colleges, which was rare at the time.

In 1883, he resigned from the clergy, having concluded that Anglicanism was incompatible with his philosophical beliefs.

In 1903 he was elected President of the college, a post he held until his death.

I began at once somewhat more steady work on the subjects and books which I should have to lecture on. I now first hit upon the diagrammatical device of representing propositions by inclusive and exclusive circles. Of course the device was not new then, but it was so obviously representative of the way in which any one, who approached the subject from the mathematical side, would attempt to visualise propositions, that it was forced upon me almost at once.

— John Venn

With his son, Venn developed a bowling machine that was able to impart spin to a cricket ball. When members of the Australian cricket team visited Cambridge in June 1909, Venn’s machine bowled Victor Trumper, one of their star batsmen. The machine was recreated in 2024 by the university engineering department.

In 1883, Venn was elected a Fellow of the Royal Society, and in 1884, he was awarded a Sc.D. by Cambridge.

He died on 4 April 1923.

Buried at Trumpington churchyard extension, at the junction of Shelford Road and Hauxton Road. Grave located about halfway along path, on East side, shaded by trees.

== Civic and personal life ==
In 1868, Venn married Susanna Carnegie Edmonstone with whom he had one son, John Archibald Venn. His son entered the mathematics field as well and became Vice-Chancellor of Cambridge University.

Venn was an active member of civic society in Cambridge. He was a committee member of the Cambridge Charitable Organisations Society, elected vice-chairman in December 1884. Venn was president of the Cambridge Antiquarian Society in 1908–1909. He is also listed as a vice president of the Cambridge Provident Medical Institution.

Venn was a supporter of votes for women. He co-signed with his wife Susanna, a letter to the Cambridge Independent Press, published 16 October 1908, encouraging women to put themselves forward as candidates for the Cambridge Town Council elections. The letter was co-sponsored by Maud Darwin and Florence Ada Keynes.

Venn was also a gardener, regularly taking part in local competitions organised by groups such as the Cambridgeshire Horticultural Society, winning prizes for his roses in July 1885 and for his white carrots later that September.

Lived at Vicarsbrook, Chaucer Road, Cambridge from the early 1900s until his death in April 1923.

== Memorial ==
- In 2017 the Drypool Bridge in Hull was decorated with intersecting circles, in honour of Venn and an unofficial 'blue plaque' is installed near the same location on Clarence Street.
- Venn is conmemorativa at the University of Hull by the Venn Building.
- A stained glass window in the dining hall of Gonville and Caius College, Cambridge, commemorates Venn's work.
- Venn Street in Clapham, London, which was the home of his grandfather, shows a Venn diagram on the street sign.
- In March 2019, one of the rooms in Clay Farm Centre, Trumpington, south Cambridge was named the Venn Touchdown.

== Publications ==
Venn compiled Alumni Cantabrigienses, a biographical register of former members of the University of Cambridge. It was edited by Venn and his son John Archibald Venn and published by Cambridge University Press in ten volumes between 1922 and 1953.

His other works include:

- Venn, John (January 1876). "Consistency and Real Inference". Mind. 1 (1).
- Venn, John (1881). Symbolic Logic. London: Macmillan and Company. ISBN 978-1-4212-6044-0
- Venn, John (1880). "On the Employment of Geometrical Diagrams for the Sensible Representation of Logical Propositions". Proceedings of the Cambridge Philosophical Society. 4: 47–59.
- Venn, John (1866). The Logic of Chance: An Essay on the Foundations and Province of the Theory of Probability, with Especial Reference to Its Application to Moral and Social Science (First ed.). London and Cambridge: Macmillan.. Two further editions were published.
- Venn, John (1901). Caius College. London: F. E. Robinson & Co.
- Caius, John (1904). Venn, John (ed.). The Annals of Gonville and Caius College. Printed for the Cambridge Antiquarian Society, sold by Deighton, Bell & Co.
- Venn, John (1904). Annals of a Clerical Family: Being Some Account of the Family and Descendants of William Venn, Vicar of Otterton, Devon, 1600–1621. Cambridge: Cambridge University Press. ISBN 978-1-108-04492-9
- Venn, John (1870). On Some of the Characteristics of Belief. London and Cambridge: Macmillan and Co.
