= Roland Allen =

English missionary

Roland Allen (29 December 1868 – 9 June 1947) was an English missionary to China sent by the Society for the Propagation of the Gospel (SPG).

== Early life ==
He was born in Bristol, England, the son of an Anglican priest; but was orphaned early in life. He was educated at Bristol Grammar School and after winning a scholarship to study at St. John's College, Oxford, Allen also studied at the (Anglo-Catholic) Leeds Clergy Training School.

== Career ==
Allen was ordained a deacon in 1892 and priest the following year. Allen spent two periods in Northern China working for the SPG. The first, from 1895 to 1900, ended due to the Boxer Rebellion, during which Allen was forced to flee to the British Legation in Beijing. He was a chaplain to community throughout much of the siege. After a period back in England, he returned to North China in 1902, but was forced home due to illness. These early experiences led him to a radical reassessment of his own vocation and the theology and missionary methods of the Western churches’.

Allen became an early advocate of establishing Churches that from the beginning would be self-supporting, self-propagating, and self-governing, adapted to local conditions and not merely imitations of Western Christianity. These views were confirmed by a trip to India in 1910 and by later research in Canada and East Africa. With this background, Allen wrote his book Missionary Methods, which was first published in 1912. It is possible that his thought was influenced in part by the earlier primitivist writings of Anthony Norris Groves and by the Brethren movement.

Allen's approach to mission strategy for indigenous churches is based on the study of Saint Paul’s missionary methods, as he was convinced that he found in them the solution to most of the difficulties of the day. He believed recognition of the church as a local entity and trust in the Holy Spirit's indwelling within the converts and churches was the mark of Paul's success. In contrast was Allen's belief that the people of his day were unable to entrust their converts to the Holy Spirit and instead relied in His work through them.

His views became increasingly influential, though Allen himself became disillusioned with the established churches. He spent the last years of his life in Kenya. Near the end of his life Allen wrote The Family Rite. In this essay Allen advocates that the family again becomes the center of the Christian church and its ministry. Allen died in Nairobi. His funeral was conducted by the Bishop of Mombasa and his gravestone can be found in Nairobi's City Park. A simple stone cross with the inscription on the pedestal reads: "ROLAND ALLEN, CLERK IN HOLY ORDERS, 1868–1947, I AM THE RESURRECTION AND THE LIFE SAITH THE LORD"

== Works ==
- The Siege of the Peking Legations, 1901
- Missionary methods : St. Paul's or ours : a study of the church in the four provinces, London : R. Scott, 1912
- Missionary principles, London : R. Scott, 1913
- Pentecost & the World: the revelation of the Holy Spirit in the 'Acts of the Apostles', London : Oxford University Press, 1917
- Educational principles and missionary methods : the application of educational principles to missionary evangelism, London : R. Scott, 1919
- Missionary survey as an aid to intelligent co-operation in foreign missions, (co-authored with Thomas Cochrane), London : Longmans, Green, 1920
- Voluntary clergy, London : SPCK, 1923
- The spontaneous expansion of the church : and the causes which hinder it, London : The World dominion press, 1927
- Devolution and its real significance, (co-authored with Alexander McLeish), 1927
- Sidney James Wells Clark. A vision of foreign missions, 1937

=== Modern editions ===
- The Ministry of the Spirit. Selected Writings, Cambridge: Lutterworth Press, 2006, ISBN 978-0-7188-9173-2; edited by David M. Paton; foreword by Lamin Sanneh.
- Missionary Methods. St Paul's or Ours?, Cambridge: Lutterworth Press, 2006, ISBN 978-0-7188-9168-8; foreword by Bishop Michael Nazir-Ali.
- Missionary Principles and Practice, Cambridge: Lutterworth Press, 2006, ISBN 978-0-7188-9170-1; foreword by Brian Stanley.
- The Spontaneous Expansion of the Church and the Causes which Hinder it., Cambridge: Lutterworth Press, 2006, ISBN 978-0-7188-9171-8; foreword by Bishop Michael Turnbull.
- Reform of the Ministry. A Study in the Work of Roland Allen, Cambridge: Lutterworth Press, 2006, ISBN 978-0-7188-9103-9; edited by David M. Paton.

=== Biography ===
- Allen, Hubert, Roland Allen: Pioneer, Priest and Prophet, Grand Rapids, Eerdmans, 1995

== See also ==
- Anthony Norris Groves, whose "back-to-the-Bible" strategies predated Allen's by eighty years, and whose personal influence may be seen in Allen's desire to recover New Testament mission methods.
- Total Ministry, a style of ministry that empowers the laity to do Christian service, the development of which was influenced by Allen's writings.
