= Rufus Anderson =

American minister

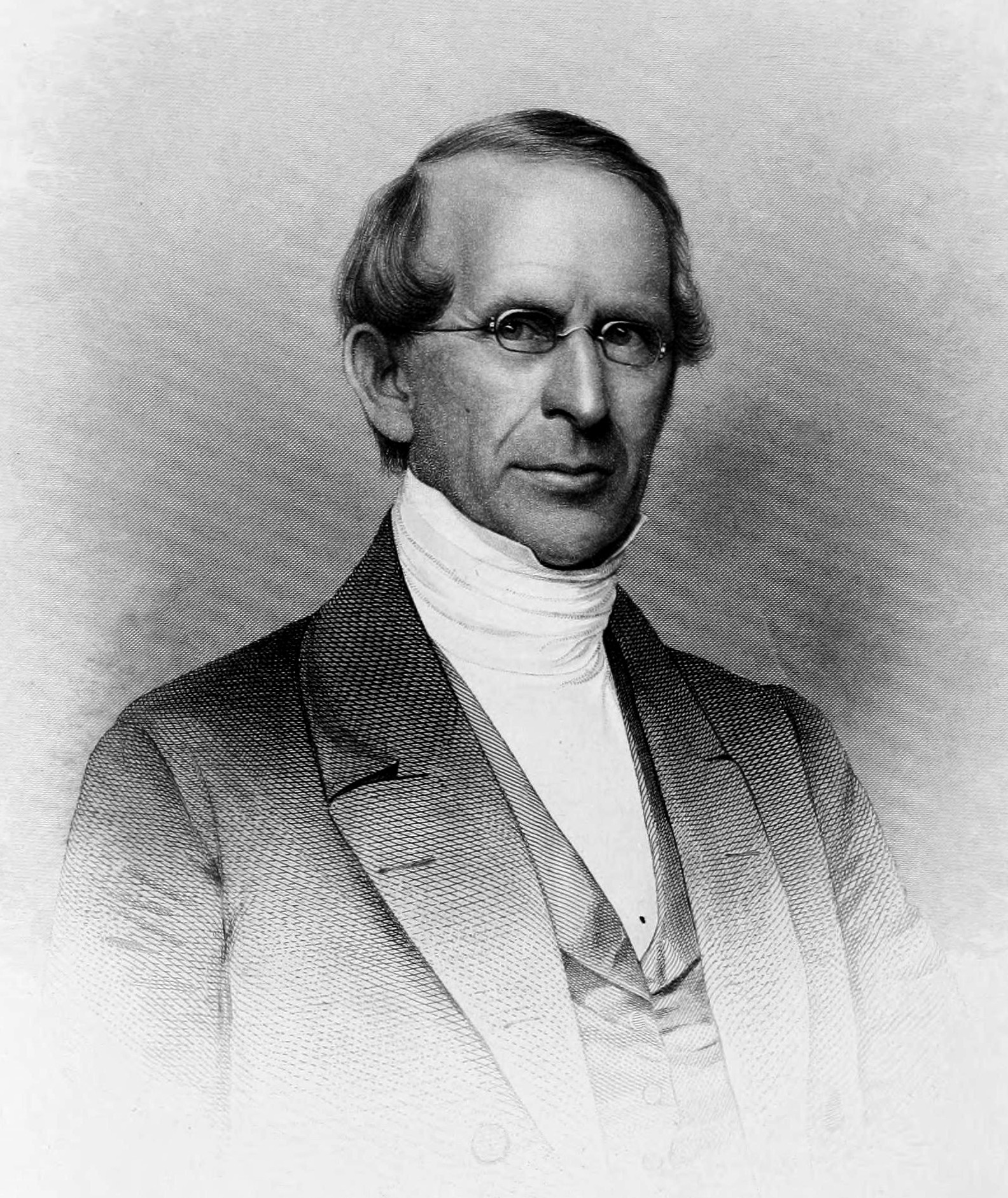
- An illustration of Anderson
- Born: August 17, 1796; North Yarmouth, Maine, U.S.
- Died: May 23, 1880 (aged 83); Boston, Massachusetts, U.S.
- Spouse: Eliza Hill
- Children: Henry Hill; Edward; Sarah Jane

Rufus Anderson (August 17, 1796 – May 23, 1880) was an American minister who spent several decades organizing overseas missions.

== Personal life ==
Rufus Anderson was born in North Yarmouth, Maine, in 1796. His father, also named Rufus Anderson, was Congregationalist pastor of the church in North Yarmouth. His mother was Hannah Parsons. He graduated from Bowdoin College in 1818, and from Andover Theological Seminary in 1822, and was ordained as a minister in 1826. He married Eliza Hill (1804–1880) on January 8, 1827.

== Career in missions ==
He worked at the American Board of Commissioners for Foreign Missions (ABCFM) as an assistant while studying at Andover. In 1822 he applied to go to India but was asked to remain at headquarters and later appointed assistant secretary. In 1832 he was given total responsibility for overseas work as a Secretary of the ABCFM. In this capacity, he corresponded with missionaries from around the world.

He traveled in Latin America (1819,1823-1824), the Mediterranean and Near East (1828-1829, 1843–1844), India, Ceylon, Syria, and Turkey (1854-1855), and Hawaii (1863). During the winter of 1843–1844, he visited the ABCFM's mission stations in Turkey.

He resigned as ABCFM secretary in 1866 but continued on the ABCFM Prudential Committee until 1875. From 1867 to 1869 he delivered at Andover seminary lectures on foreign missions. In 1868 Dartmouth college conferred upon him the degree of LL.D., and he was made a fellow of the American Oriental society.

== Theology of missions ==
Anderson believed that "missions are instituted for the spread of a scriptural self-propagating Christianity". Missions were for:

- converting lost men,
- organizing them into churches,
- giving these churches a competent native ministry,
- conducting them to the stage of independence and (in most cases) of self-propagation.

Anything beyond this, he felt, was secondary. The end of the mission was to be "a scriptural, self propagating Christianity" the test of which is seen in evidence of a religious life, a genuine change in the church and the individual.

He wrote that Bible translation, literature, schools, press and all other activities should be directed to building a mature local church which evangelized and sent out others as missionaries. He also prohibited any mission becoming engaged with a government or engaging in any kind of business. He advocated cooperation with other societies to avoid the waste of people and money. To Anderson, civilization was not a legitimate aim of the mission but would come as an impact of the gospel, this went against the nature of mission in his time which started with civilization of the natives.

The missionary was not to be a pastor or ruler but an evangelist, moving on to the next place as soon as possible; their business was with unbelievers, not believers. The society existed solely to help the missionary discharge their duty rather than making them a servant. Native ministers were to be the spiritual leaders.

Though there is dispute as to who wrote about the idea first, the "three-self" method is attributed to both Anderson and Henry Venn. They both wrote about the need for creating churches in the missions field that were self-supporting, self-governing, and self-propagating.

He published several books, as well as many articles in The Missionary Herald. He is remembered in Sri Lanka for shutting down American Ceylon Mission's popular Batticotta Seminary because it was not converting enough locals to Christianity. He traveled from Boston to the Hawaiian Islands in 1863, crossing the Panama Isthmus by rail, later describing the trip in a book. After retiring in 1866 wrote a history of the missions there.

He died in 1880 in Boston and was buried in Forest Hills Cemetery after a funeral at Eliot Congregational Church. His son Edward Anderson became a chaplain in the American Civil War.

== See also ==
- Indigenous church mission theory
