= Clapham =

District of London

Coordinates: 51.46°N 0.14°W

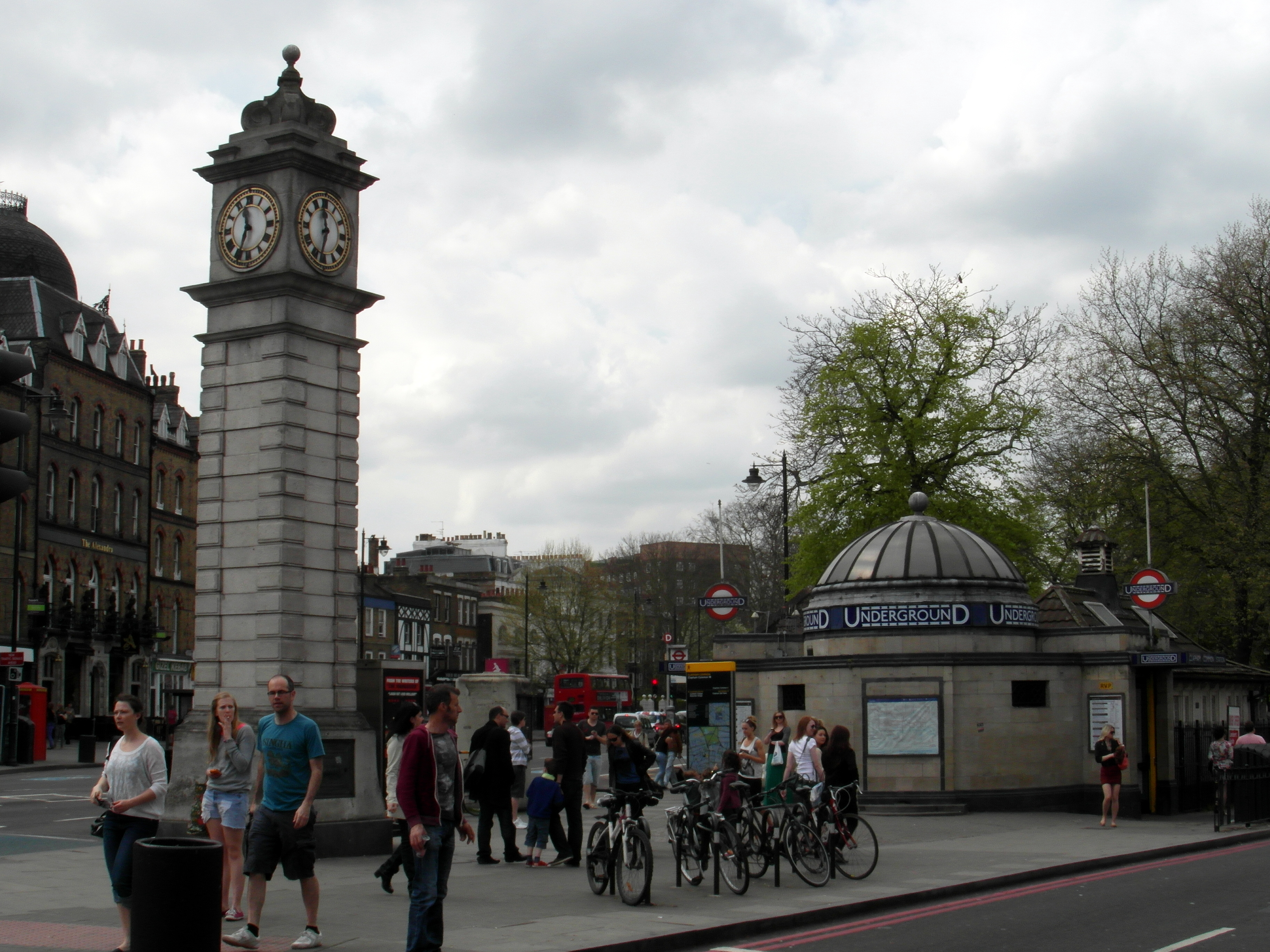
- Clapham Common Station and clock

- Location within Greater London
- Population: 48,478
- OS grid reference: TQ296754
- London borough: Lambeth; Wandsworth
- Ceremonial county: Greater London
- Region: London
- Country: England
- Sovereign state: United Kingdom
- Post town: LONDON
- Postcode district: SW4, SW8, SW9, SW11 and SW12
- Dialling code: 020
- Police: Metropolitan
- Fire: London
- Ambulance: London
- UK Parliament: Clapham & Brixton Hill
- London Assembly: Lambeth and Southwark; Merton and Wandsworth

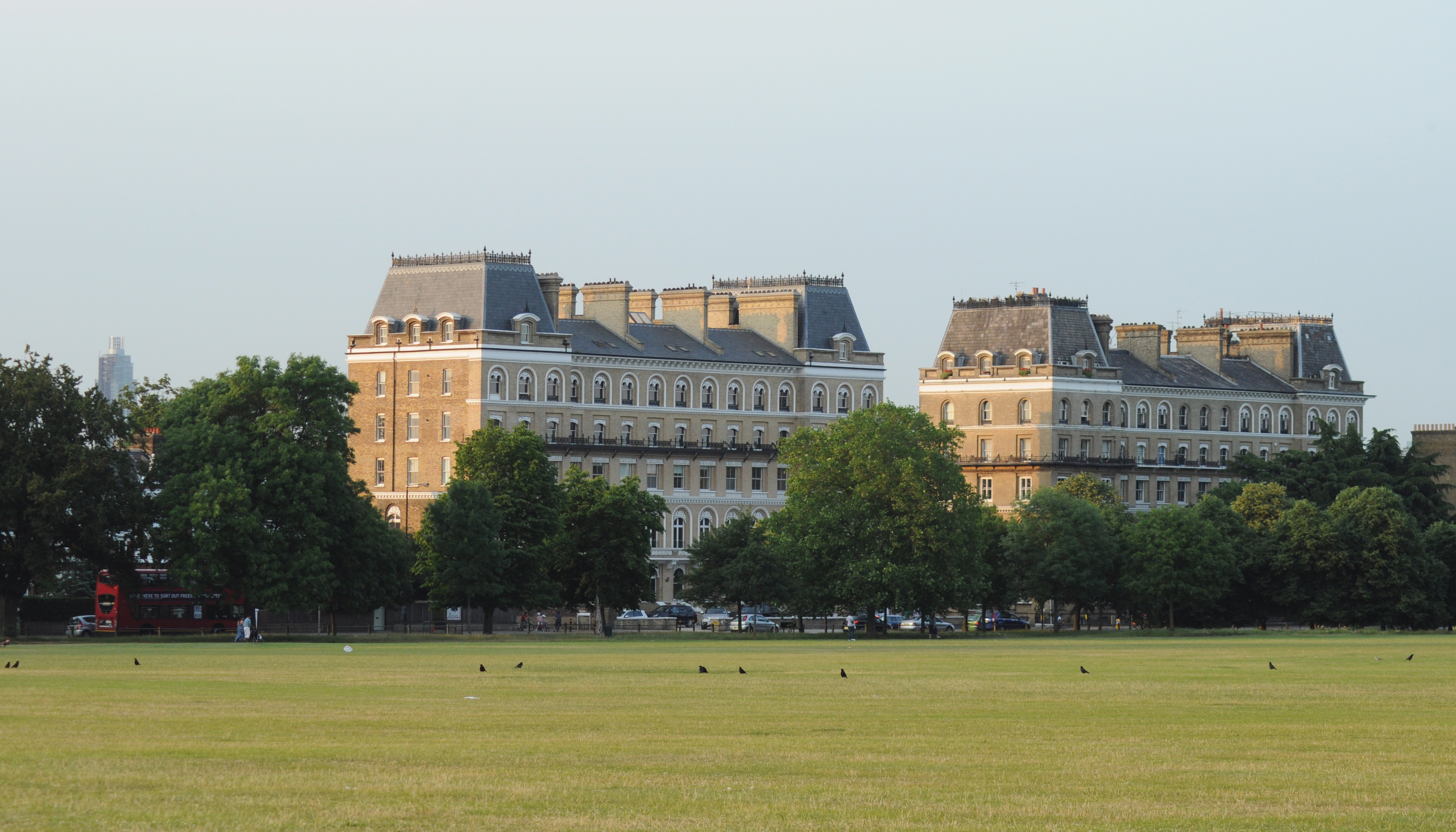
Clapham Common at 220 acres (89 ha)

Clapham (/ˈklæpəm/) is a district in South London, England, lying mostly within the London Borough of Lambeth, but with some areas (including Clapham Common) extending westward into the neighbouring London Borough of Wandsworth.

== History ==
=== Early history ===
The present day Clapham High Street is on the route of a Roman road. The road is recorded on a Roman monumental stone found nearby. According to its inscription, the stone was erected by a man named Vitus Ticinius Ascanius. It is estimated to date from the 1st century AD. (The stone was discovered during building works at Clapham Common South Side in 1912. It is now placed by the entrance of the former Clapham Library, in the Old Town.)

According to the history of the Clapham family, maintained by the College of Heralds, in 965 King Edgar of England gave a grant of land at Clapham to Jonas, son of the Duke of Lorraine, and Jonas was thenceforth known as Jonas "de [of] Clapham". The family remained in possession of the land until Jonas's great-great grandson Arthur opposed William the Conqueror during the Norman Conquest of 1066 and, losing the land, fled to the north (where the Clapham family remained thereafter, primarily in Yorkshire).

Clapham's name derives from Old English, meaning 'homestead or enclosure near a hill', with the first recorded usage being Cloppaham circa 880.

Clapham appears in Domesday Book as Clopeham. It was held by Goisfrid (Geoffrey) de Mandeville, and its domesday assets were three hides, six ploughs, and 5.0 acres (2.0 ha) of meadow. It rendered £7 10s 0d, and was located in Brixton hundred.

The parish comprised 1,233 acres (499 ha). The benefice remains to this day a rectory, and in the 19th century was in the patronage of the Atkins family: the tithes were commuted for £488 14s. in the early 19th century, and so the remaining glebe comprised only 11 acres (4.5 ha) as of 1848. The church, on the site of the current St Paul's and belonging to Merton Priory was, with the exception of the north aisle which was left standing for the performance of burials, taken down under an act of parliament in 1774. A new church, Holy Trinity, was erected in the following year at an expense of £11,000 (equivalent to £1,433,935 in 2025), on the north side of the Common.

=== Clapham in the 17th–19th centuries ===
In the late 17th century, large country houses began to be built there, and throughout the 18th and early 19th century it was favoured by the wealthier merchant classes of the City of London, who built many large and gracious houses and villas around Clapham Common and in the Old Town. Samuel Pepys spent the last two years of his life in Clapham, living with his friend and former servant William Hewer, until his death in 1703.

Clapham was also home to Elizabeth Cook, the widow of Captain James Cook the explorer. She lived in a house at 136 Clapham High Street for many years following the death of her husband.

Other notable residents of Clapham Common include Palace of Westminster architect Sir Charles Barry, Norwegian composer Edvard Grieg and 20th-century novelist Graham Greene. John Francis Bentley, architect of Westminster Cathedral, lived in the adjacent Old Town.

In the late 18th and early 19th centuries, the Clapham Sect were a group of wealthy City merchants (mostly evangelical Anglican) social reformers who lived around the Common. They included William Wilberforce, Henry Thornton and Zachary Macaulay, father of the historian Thomas Macaulay, as well as William Smith Member of Parliament (MP), the Dissenter and Unitarian. They were very prominent in campaigns for the abolition of slavery and child labour, and for prison reform. They also promoted missionary activities in Britain's colonies. The Society for Missions to Africa and the East (as the Church Mission Society was first called) was founded on 12 April 1799 at a meeting of the Eclectic Society, supported by members of the Clapham Sect, who met under the guidance of John Venn, the Rector of Clapham. By contrast, an opponent of Wilberforce, merchant and slave-trader George Hibbert also lived at Clapham Common, worshipping in the same church, Holy Trinity.

In 1848, Clapham was described in the Topographical Dictionary of England as a village which "has for many years, been one of the most respectable in the environs of the metropolis". At this time, the patronage of Holy Trinity Church belonged to the Atkins family.

=== Clapham in the 20th and 21st centuries ===
After the coming of the railways, Clapham developed as a suburb for commuters into central London. Clapham High Street railway station opened in 1862 and the underground City and South London Railway was extended to the area in 1900. By 1900 Clapham had fallen from favour with the upper classes. Many of their grand houses had been demolished by the middle of the 20th century, though a number remain around the Common and in the Old Town, as do a substantial number of fine late 18th- and early 19th-century houses. Today's Clapham is an area of varied housing, from the large Queen Anne-, Regency- and Georgian-era homes of the Old Town and Clapham Common, to the grids of Victorian housing in the Abbeville area. As in much of London, the area also includes social housing on estates dating from the 1930s and 1960s.

In the early 20th century, Clapham was seen as an ordinary commuter suburb, often cited as representing ordinary people: hence the familiar "man on the Clapham omnibus". By the 1980s, the area had undergone a further transformation, becoming the centre for the gentrification of most of the surrounding area. Clapham's relative proximity to traditionally expensive areas of central London led to an increase in the number of middle-class people living in Clapham. Today the area is generally an affluent place, although many of its professional residents live relatively close to significant pockets of social housing.

In 2026 Clapham has experienced significant levels of antisocial behaviour from masked youths which have been "fuelled by online trends."

=== Local government ===
A map showing the Clapham wards of Wandsworth Metropolitan Borough as it appeared in 1916.

Clapham was an ancient parish in the county of Surrey. For poor law purposes the parish became part of the Wandsworth and Clapham Union in 1836. The parish was added to the Registrar General London Metropolis area in 1844 and consequently it came within the area of responsibility of the Metropolitan Board of Works in 1855. The population of 16,290 in 1851 was considered too small for the Clapham vestry to be a viable sanitary authority and the parish was grouped into the Wandsworth District, electing 18 members to the Wandsworth District Board of Works. In 1889 the parish was transferred to the County of London and in 1900 it became part of the new Metropolitan Borough of Wandsworth. It was abolished as a civil parish on 1 April 1904, becoming part of the single Wandsworth Borough parish for poor law. At the 1901 census (the last before the abolition of the parish), Clapham Holy Trinity had a population of 51,361. The former Metropolitan Borough of Wandsworth was divided in 1965 and the area of the historic parish of Clapham was transferred to the London Borough of Lambeth, along with Streatham. Clapham gave its name to a Parliamentary constituency between 1885 and 1974. Between 1974 and 2024 Clapham was divided between the constituencies of Streatham and Vauxhall. From the 2024 General Election Clapham's wards are reunited in the new constituency of Clapham and Brixton Hill.

== Geography ==
In the postal system, Clapham fills most of SW4 and as defined, at least since the Norman Conquest until 1885, includes parts of SW8, SW9 and SW12, London. Clapham Common is shared with the London Borough of Wandsworth (the boundary between the two boroughs runs across the Common), but Lambeth has responsibility for its management. According to the 2011 census, the Clapham area has a population of 40,850. For administrative and electoral purposes, Clapham is made up of three Lambeth wards: Clapham Common and Abbeville, Clapham Town and Clapham East.

Much of southern Battersea is often incorrectly referred to as Clapham, because of the name of Clapham Junction railway station, and to stress Battersea's proximity to Clapham Common, as well as their relative distance from Battersea's historic nucleus. The railway station now called Clapham Junction was originally named Battersea Junction by its architect to reflect its geographical location.

== Demography ==
According to the 2021 census, Clapham has a population of 48,478. White is the largest ethnic group, at 64% of the population, followed by 19% Black. Clapham is home to one of the largest Australian communities in London.

== Clapham Common ==
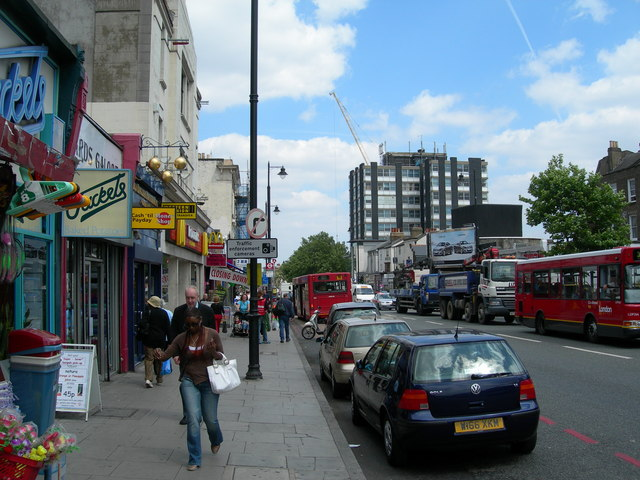
Clapham High St

Clapham Common comprises 220 acres of green space, criss-crossed by footpaths, with three ponds, a Victorian bandstand and a large number of mature trees, including horse chestnuts and a significant avenue of London plane trees along Long Road. It is overlooked by a variety of buildings, including a number of Georgian and Victorian mansions. It also has Holy Trinity Clapham, an 18th-century Georgian church, important in the history of the evangelical Clapham Sect. Clapham Town comprises Clapham High Street and residential streets including Clapham Manor Street, home to Clapham Leisure Centre, as well as Venn Street with a cinema, restaurants and a food market held every weekend throughout the year.

== Clapham South ==
The neighbourhood derives its name from Clapham South tube station. It is predominantly mid-rise and low-rise residential.

== Clapham North ==
Clapham North lies on either side of Clapham Road and borders the relatively modern creation 'Stockwell' in the historic Lambeth parish on Union Road and Stirling Road. There is a "Stockwell Town" Partnership sign north of Union Road demarcating the boundary between Clapham and Stockwell. The northern part of Clapham in the Larkhall ward includes the Sibella conservation area. The southern part is Ferndale ward and includes Landor, Ferndale and Bedford roads leading up to Brixton.

== Transport ==
As well as an extensive bus network, which connects the area with much of south and central London, Clapham has three tube stations and two railway stations.

There are two railway stations in the district on London Overground's Windrush line:

- Clapham High Street
- Wandsworth Road

London Underground's Northern line passes through Clapham, with three stations:

- Clapham North (opened as Clapham Road in 1900, changed to its current name in 1926).
- Clapham Common
- Clapham South

In 2012, the Overground East London line (since 2024 the Windrush line) was extended to Clapham High Street and Wandsworth Road stations. This links Clapham directly to stations including Canada Water, Peckham Rye, Shoreditch and Highbury and Islington.

== Shopping ==
Shopping areas comprise:

- Clapham Old Town, which includes pubs and restaurants.
- Clapham High Street
- Abbeville Road (and Clapham South)
- Nightingale Lane (on borders of Clapham South)
- Clapham Road

== Sport ==
- Football club Clapham Rovers F.C., winners of the FA Cup in 1880, were based in Clapham prior to their move to Tooting Bec Common at the end of the 1870–71 season.

== Notable former and current residents ==
- Henry Allingham – supercentenarian
- Benjamin Franklin – American Founding Father
- John Amaechi – writer, basketball player
- Kingsley Amis – novelist
- Leslie Ash – actress
- Frank Baines – architect
- Natasha Bedingfield – singer
- John Francis Bentley
- F. H. Bradley – philosopher
- Jo Brand – comedian, was born in Clapham
- Jeremy Brett – actor
- David Calder
- Angela Carter – writer
- Henry Cavendish – scientist
- Matteo Ceccarini – DJ
- John Cole – first-class cricketer and British Army officer
- Brian Dowling
- Michael Duberry
- Huw Edwards – newsreader
- Barry Fantoni – musician and author
- Sarah Ferguson – Royal family member, film producer and aviator
- William Gilbert – author and Royal Navy surgeon
- Chad Gould – footballer
- Graham Greene – author
- Ainsley Harriott – chef
- Marea Hartman – sports administrator
- Lena Headey – actress
- Gerry Healy
- George Hibbert – slave trader
- Damon Hill – racing driver
- Paul Kaye
- John Keegan
- Marie Kendall – music-hall star
- Doon Mackichan – comedian
- Tony Mansfield – songwriter, musician and record producer
- Miriam Margolyes – actress
- Alfred Marshall
- Donald Maxwell (illustrator)
- Noel McKoy – singer
- Vera Menchik – Women's World Chess Champion
- Heather Mills – model
- Julie Myerson
- Chris O'Dowd
- John O'Farrell
- Neil Pearson – actor
- Samuel Pepys – administrator and diarist
- Pete Phipps – singer, songwriter
- Anna and Ellen Pigeon – mountaineers
- Eric Prydz – musician
- Claude Rains – actor
- Corin Redgrave – actor
- Vanessa Redgrave – actress
- Kelly Reilly
- Eva Riccobono – actress
- Charlotte Ritchie – actress and singer
- Jamie Flatters – actor and filmmaker
- Margot Robbie – actress
- Natsume Sōseki
- Mark Steel – comedian
- Lytton Strachey – writer
- Mark Thomas – comedian
- Henry Thornton – abolitionist
- Polly Toynbee – journalist
- Henry Venn – Curate of Clapham and a founder of the Clapham Sect
- Rosina Vokes – actress and dancer
- Victoria Vokes – actress and dancer
- Dennis Waterman – actor
- Orlando Weeks
- Vivienne Westwood – couturier
- Jacquetta Wheeler
- William Wilberforce – abolitionist
- Holly Willoughby – television presenter
- Patrick Wolf – singer-songwriter
- Christopher Wood – novelist and screenwriter
- Augustus Pitt Rivers – general, ethnologist, and archaeologist

== See also ==
- St Paul's Church, Clapham
- Clapham Park
- Clapham Sect
- The man on the Clapham omnibus
- Little Australia
