= John Scott (banker) =

English banker, evangelical Christian, pacifist, and abolitionist

- Born: January 28, 1757; Woolwich, England
- Died: April 19, 1832 (aged 75); Stoke Newington, England
- Occupation: Banker
- Spouses: Mary Whinnell (m. 1780; died 1818) Anne Ley (m. 1819)

John Scott (28 January 1757 – 19 April 1832) was an English banker, evangelical Christian and pacifist. He was a founder member of the Peace Society in London, and was associated with the anti-slavery movement and various abolitionist figures of the day.

== Early life ==
He was the son of William Scott (died 1775), a shipwright of Woolwich and his wife Elizabeth Watts. At the age of twelve he was apprenticed to a City of London jeweller and goldsmith, James Duppa in Aldgate. Scott spent much of his youth attending open air evangelical meetings, with sermons given by known preachers of the day such as William Romaine, Erasmus Middleton, and in particular Rowland Hill who led the Surrey Chapel in Southwark.

In 1780, he married Mary Whinnell at the church of St George in the East. The family initially resided in Woolwich, but by 1805 were living on Worship Street, close to Finsbury Square.

== Career ==
Around this time Scott joined the staff of the banking firm Down, Thornton & Free (or simply Down & Co.), of which Henry Thornton was one of the senior partners. By 1815 original partners Henry Thornton and Richard Down had died and a new partnership was formed involving Scott. It began to trade as Pole, Thornton, Free, Down & Scott, with the original partner's names being retained. Henry Thornton's eldest son Henry Sykes Thornton later joined the firm as a partner in 1825.

In that same year the bank failed in a financial crash, from which Scott suffered a huge personal loss. Surrendering most of his assets, including the lease of his house in Canonbury Square, he retired in 1826 to the then village of Stoke Newington, a notable place of habitation for nonconformists, where he lived with his second wife Anne until his death. His first wife Mary had died in 1818.

== Peace Society ==
Initially a Calvinist of the Church of England, Scott became a Calvinistic Methodist. At various points in his life he attended the Tabernacle Chapel, which had been founded by the preacher George Whitefield; the Union Chapel in Islington; and later a Congregationalist chapel in Stoke Newington. He was a congregant of the Tabernacle for over fifty years and was credited with establishing its Sabbath school for children. In 1816, after the long wars against France, he was one of the founding committee members of the Peace Society and served as their treasurer.

His position within the city brought him into contact with other like-minded Christians and abolitionists such as Thomas Clarkson, and the reformed slaver John Newton, for whose last will and testament Scott was an executor; Newton had been the rector of St Mary Woolnoth just a stone's throw from where the bank was based in Bartholomew Lane. Through his work with the bank and friendship with the Thornton family, Scott was also affiliated to some degree with the aims of the Clapham Sect and is mentioned in the letters of Marianne Thornton. He was involved with a number of other strongly active Christian organisations such as the Hibernian Society, the Continental Society, the Canada Education Society, and the Newport Pagnell Evangelical Institution or Academy, a college established by William Bull to train clergy for dissenting churches.

== Death and legacy ==
Scott died peacefully on 19 April 1832, at the age of 75. A funeral sermon was preached at the Independent Meeting House, Stoke Newington, by the congregationalist minister John Jefferson, in which he said of the deceased: "I have only known him as an old man and an aged Christian, ripe for glory. My first introduction to him was in November 1830, on business connected with the Anti-slavery Society, and a meeting of its friends to be held in this village. He was present at that meeting, and read a speech on the occasion, short, but pithy, and very much to the purpose. From that period I have enjoyed frequent opportunities of intercourse with this holy man, and I never could retire from his society without feeling that I was the better for his converse, and without being constrained to admire the grace which shone so conspicuously in him".

John Scott's position as the Peace Society's treasurer was assumed by the banker Samuel Gurney.

== Family & Livery companies ==
John Scott married on 20 February 1780, Mary Whinnell (1751–1818), daughter of Benjamin Whinnell of Wimborne, Dorset, and secondly on 11 May 1819, Anne Ley (1777–1859), daughter of Thomas Ley of Wolborough, Devon. His family retained strong ties with the City of London for successive generations. Two sons: John William Scott (1781–1834), a banker and stockbroker, and Benjamin Whinnell Scott (1782–1841), the Chief clerk of the Chamberlain's Court, like their father were both liverymen with the Worshipful Company of Glovers.

Benjamin Whinnell Scott also became a liveryman of the Worshipful Company of Wheelwrights and held the position of company clerk from 1818 until his death, when he was succeeded in that position by his sons, and later a grandson James Benjamin Scott who wrote a history of the company. These sons were: Benjamin Scott (1814–1892), who would become Chamberlain of London (and was also a Glover) and James Renat Scott (1819–1883), Clerk and Registrar of the Coal Market; both served as clerks and masters of the company. A younger son Syms Scott (1822–1863) was also a liveryman.

== Works ==
- War inconsistent with the doctrine and example of Jesus Christ: in a letter to a friend: This work by Scott has been called a "pioneering pacifist text". It was originally published in 1796, the author given as "I. Scott". At that time it was noticed by the Analytical Review and Critical Review. It is now recognised as the first London pacifist pamphlet with origins other than the Society of Friends. The Peace Society adopted it twenty years later as the second of its tracts, republishing it in 1817 and with a third edition the following year.
- A narrative of Scott's early life exists, penned by his own hand in 1818 and is in private ownership. Its contents disprove the commonly held belief that this branch of the Scott family were descended from Scot's Hall in Kent, an idea that was promulgated after John Scott's death and is erroneously recorded in genealogical works such as the Memorials of the Family of Scott, of Scot's-Hall, in the County of Kent (1876); the family in fact descends from a line of master mariners and boat builders, who moved to Rotherhithe from Bristol around 1700.

== See also ==
- Christian pacifism
- City of London
- Clapham Sect
- Henry Thornton
- John Newton
- Peace Society
- Rowland Hill
- Stoke Newington
- Thomas Clarkson
