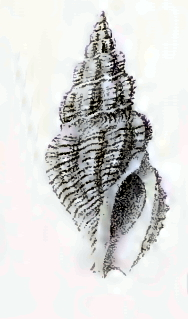
- Original image of a shell of Drillia recordata

Scientific classification
- Kingdom: Animalia
- Phylum: Mollusca
- Class: Gastropoda
- Subclass: Caenogastropoda
- Order: Neogastropoda
- Superfamily: Conoidea
- Family: Drilliidae
- Genus: Drillia
- Species: D. recordata

Binomial name
- Drillia recordata (Sykes, E.R., 1905)

Synonyms
- Drillia consociata var. recordata Sykes E.R., 1905

= Drillia recordata =

Species of gastropod

Drillia recordata is a species of sea snail, a marine gastropod mollusk in the family Drilliidae.

== Description ==
The length of the shell attains 23 mm, its diameter 9.5 mm.

The species was described from a young shell which is not in very good condition. The form now described as a variety may prove to be a distinct species. In fresh condition the shell is of an olive-green tint, with a brown area either covering the larger and lower portion of the body whorl or confined to a small region at the base. The protoconch, in the variety, is well elevated, acute, and, though a little worn, appears smooth. The shell differs from the type in its smaller size (an adult shell of the typical form, decollated, measuring 31 mm. long), by the slightly more swollen whorls, and the more numerous and more closely set longitudinal ribs, which latter are more produced over the whorls and do not leave so marked a smooth area below the suture.

The type compared to has become a synonym as Crassispira consociata (E.A. Smith, 1877).

== Distribution ==
This marine species occurs off Angola.
