= Peter von Köppen =

Russian ethnographer and historian (1793–1864)

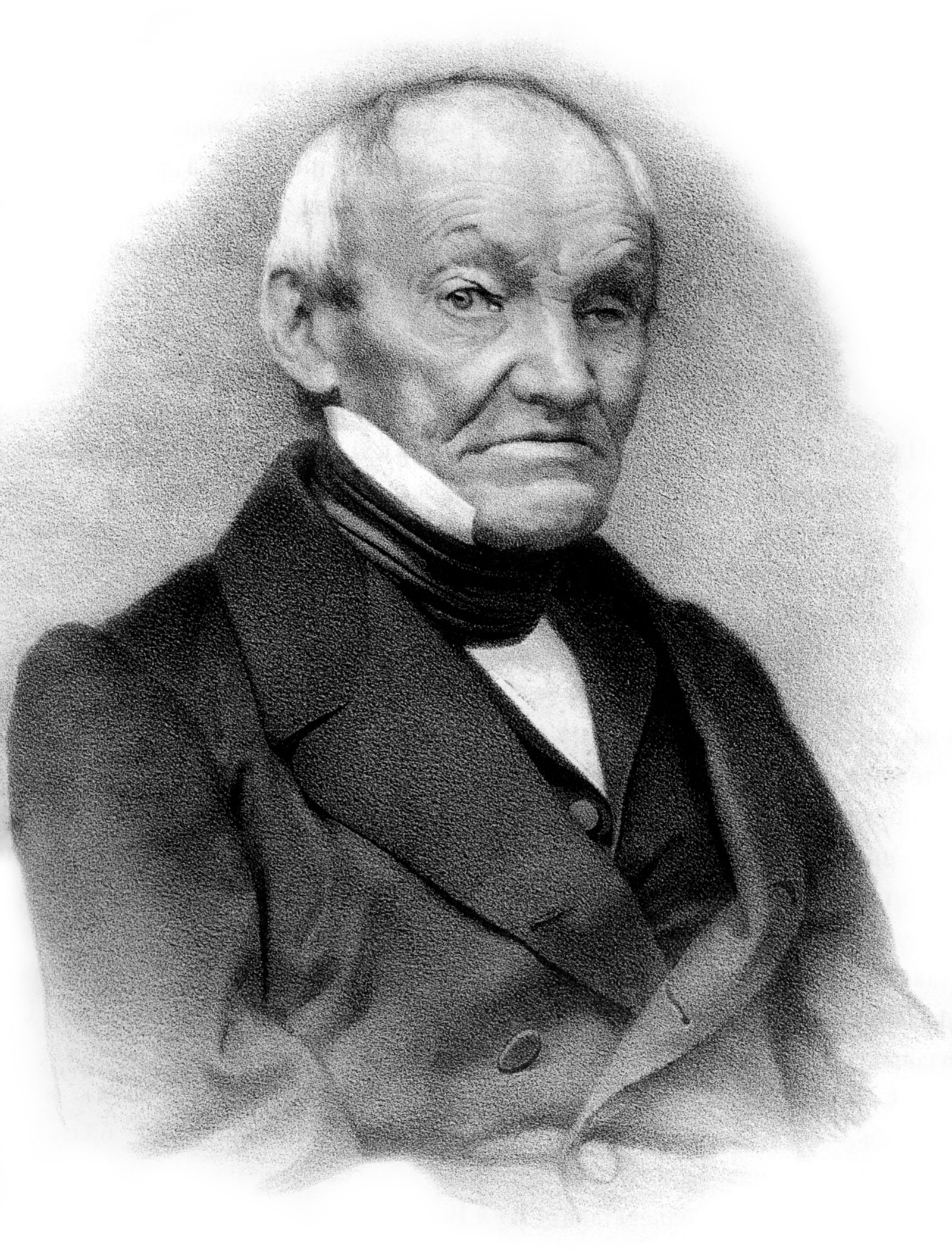
Lithograph, 1864–1869

Peter von Köppen (Note: known in Russia as Petr Köppen or Petr Keppen, Russian: Пётр Иванович Кёппен, romanized: Pyotr Ivanovich Kyoppen) (February 19, 1793 – May 23, 1864), was a Russian ethnographer, historian, statistician, and geographer of German heritage. An academician of the Petersburg Academy of Sciences (now Russian Academy of Sciences), he held the civil rank of Active State Councillor.

In 1825 he earned the degree of doctor of philosophy from the University of Tübingen and in 1826 he was elected corresponding member of the Russian Academy of Sciences.

== Early life and education ==
Peter von Köppen was born in Kharkov in 1793. His father, Johann Friedrich von Köppen, was a physician from Brandenburg who had moved to the Russian Empire at the invitation of Catherine the Great. His mother, Caroline Friedrich Schulz, was born in Hamburg, but had moved to Kharkov as a child.

Von Köppen attended gymnasium in Kharkov and trained with provincial land surveyors from 1805 to 1809. His father had intended for him to study at a German university, the father's death and the Napoleonic Wars made this impossible. Instead, Köppen enrolled at the University of Kharkov in 1809, studying law, statistics, history, and natural sciences. He graduated in 1814 with a master's degree in law, and subsequently moved to St. Petersburg, where he worked in various civil service roles, beginning at the postal department.

Through his association with his former professor of political economy, Ludwig Heinrich von Jakob, and with the academician Friedrich von Adelung, whose daughter Alexandra he married in 1830, von Köppen was introduced to contemporary scientific and literary circles. He became a founding member of the Society of Lovers of Russian Literature.

== Career ==
In 1818, von Köppen published a Russian abstract of August von Lerberg's work, titled "Historical Research on the Yugra Land." This brought him to the attention of Count Nikolay Rumyantsev, and he was appointed as an editor for the official newspaper, the Severnaya Pochta (Northern Post). Beginning in 1822, he traveled abroad and made contacts with European Slavicists. He had been tasked by the Russian Academy of Sciences to try and persuade leading Slavic scholars to move to St. Petersburg. In 1825, he received his doctorate of philosophy from the University of Tübingen and started a journal called the "Bibliographical Sheets," which reported on new Russian and other Slavic literary works. In 1826, he was elected a corresponding member of the Russian Academy of Sciences.

One of his articles in the "Bibliographical Sheets," a critical study of Saints Cyril and Methodius, prompted a formal denunciation by Russian official Mikhail Magnitsky, who claimed von Köppen was writing against the doctrines of the Orthodox Church. A special court of spiritual authorities was convened to investigate him, but he was fully exonerated.

From 1829 to 1834, von Köppen served as assistant to the chief inspector silk farming and lived in Crimea. His official duties required extensive travel between the Volga and Dniester rivers, during which he collected a large volume of data on the geography and natural history of the region.

After returning to St. Petersburg, von Köppen held a series of official and academic positions. In 1837, he was elected an Adjunct of the Academy of Sciences in Statistics. He was appointed a member of the Scientific Committee of the Ministry of State Property in 1841 and was elected an ordinary academician in Statistics in 1843. In 1845, he was one of the founding members of the Imperial Russian Geographical Society and actively participated in its work.

Von Köppen's scholarly output covered several fields. In the field of bibliography, he compiled a comprehensive, three-volume collection of source materials on the history of Russian education and literature, published between 1819 and 1827. He also published an archaeological study in 1837 on the ancient sites and artifacts found along the southern coast of Crimea and its mountains.

His work in statistics involved detailed demographic analysis, including a report on the total population of Russia in 1838 and another study using census data from the ninth imperial revision of 1851. Furthermore, he developed the systematic plan for compiling a complete list of all populated settlements in the empire, a methodology that was later adopted for a state-published gazetteer. His work on the history of Russian censuses, first submitted to the academy in 1848, was banned by the government because its views did not align with official policy. After another failed attempt to publish it in 1857, the book was only printed posthumously in 1889.

== Ethnographic mapping ==
Von Köppen is best known for his work in the field of ethnographic mapping, especially for the Ethnographic map of European Russia published in 1851 by the Imperial Russian Geographical Society.

Before his 1851 map, Köppen produced several other cartographic works. His first published ethnographic map was the Ethnographic map of Finland (1846), a small, fold-out map that accompanied a journal article. He also created the Ethnographic atlas of European Russia (1848), a manuscript atlas for academic use, that was only made in three copies. Additionally, he produced a more detailed regional map, the Ethnographic Map of St. Petersburg Governorate (1849), to examine the microgeographies of Finno-Ugric settlement in the Saint Petersburg Governorate.

After suffering several illnesses, Köppen retired from public service in 1852 and moved to his estate in Crimea. He did not create any more maps before his death in 1864.

== Major works ==
A more complete bibliography may be found at the database "История геологии и горного дела" of the Institute of Geology, Russian Academy of Sciences

- Историческое исследование о Югорской земле, в Российско-Императорском титуле упоминаемой. 1818
- Материалы для истории просвещения в России, 1819
  - vol 2: "Библиографические Листы"
- О виноделии и винной торговле в России. 1832
- Крымский Сборник. СПб., 1837
- Ueber die Dichtigkeit der Bevölkerung in den Provinzen des Europäischen Russlands, 1845
- Finnland in ethnographischer Beziehung, 1846
- Ethnographische Karte des St.-Petersburgischen Gouvernements, 1850
- Der Lithauische Volkstamm-Ausbreitung und Stärke desselben in der Mitte des XIX Jahrhunderts, 1851
- Города и селения Тульской губернии в 1857 г.
- Главные озёра и лиманы Российской империи. 1859
- О народных переписях в России. 1889.

== Awards ==
- 1852: Full Zhukovsky Prize of the Russian Geographical Society for the ethnographic map of European Russia
- 1854 Gold Konstantin Award of the Russian Geographical Society for the ethnographic map of European Russia

== Sources ==
- Gibson, Catherine (2022). Geographies of nationhood: cartography, science, and society in the Russian Imperial Baltic. Oxford studies in modern European history. Oxford University Press. ISBN 978-0-19-284432-3.
