= Lender of last resort =

Government guarantee to provide liquidity to financial institutions

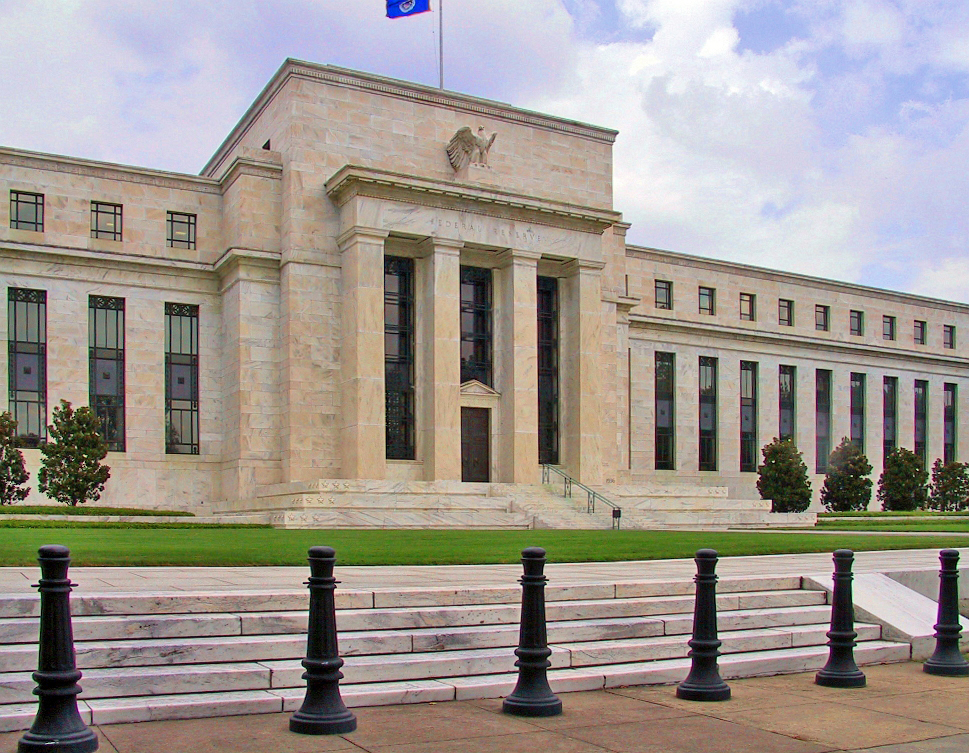
The Federal Reserve System headquarters in Washington, D.C.

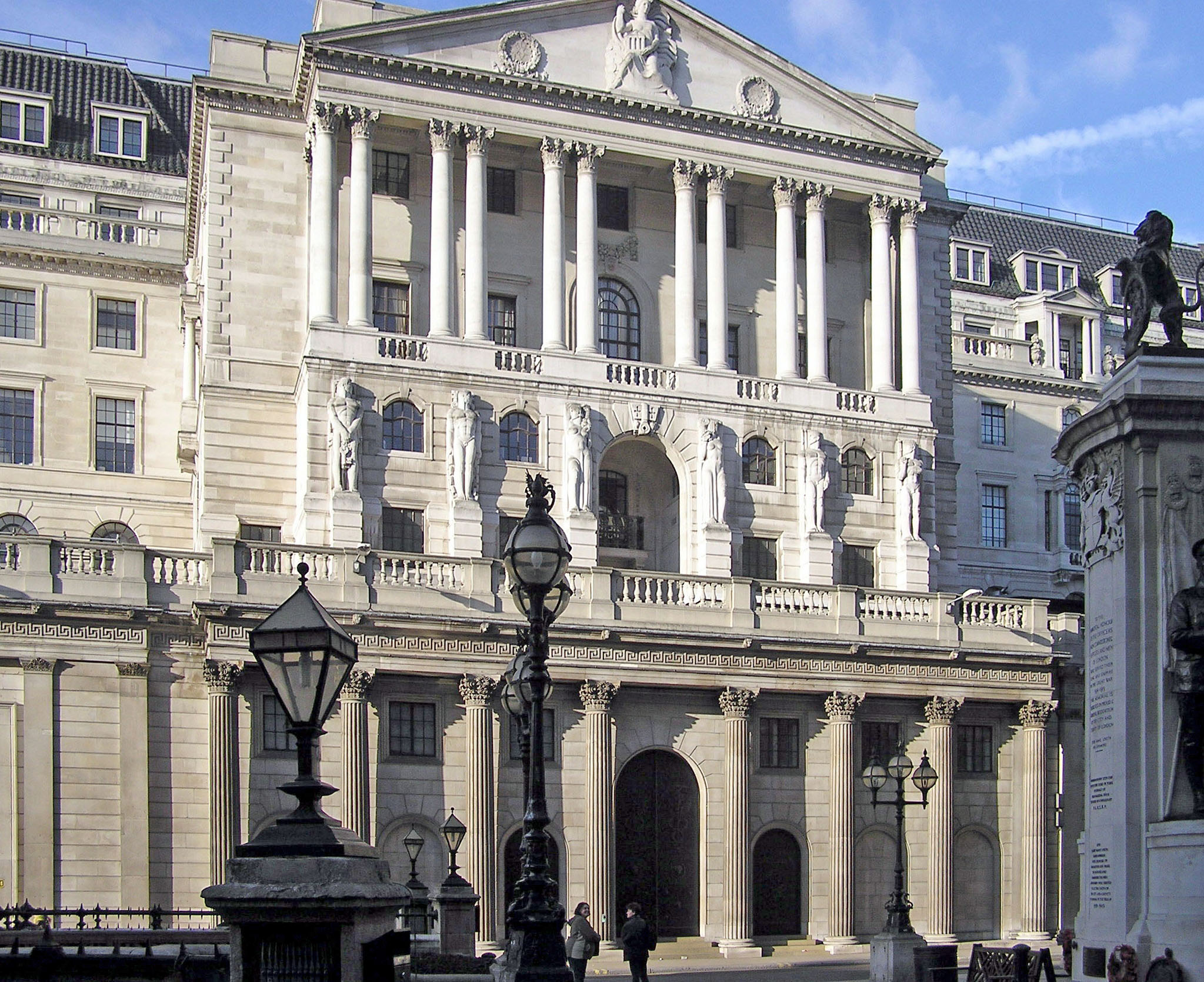
The Bank of England in London

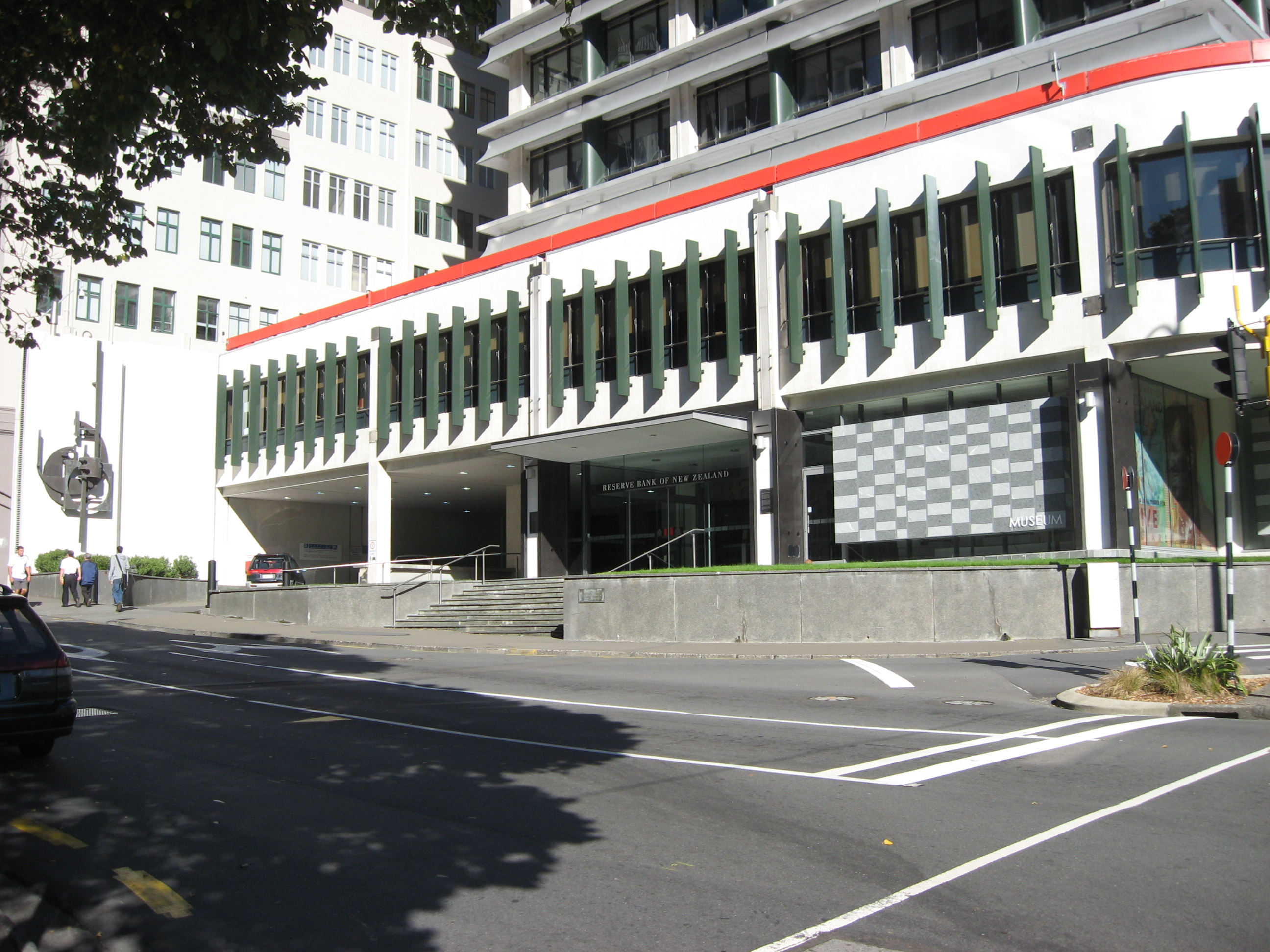
The Reserve Bank of New Zealand in Wellington

In public finance, a lender of last resort (LOLR) is a financial entity, generally a central bank, that acts as the provider of liquidity to a financial institution which finds itself unable to obtain sufficient liquidity in the interbank lending market when other facilities or such sources have been exhausted. It functions as a government guarantee of liquidity to financial institutions. Since the beginning of the 20th century, most central banks have been providers of lender of last resort facilities.

The objective is to prevent economic disruption as a result of financial panics and bank runs spreading from one bank to the others due to a lack of liquidity in the first one.

There are varying definitions of a lender of last resort, but a comprehensive one is that it is "the discretionary provision of liquidity to a financial institution (or the market as a whole) by the central bank in reaction to an adverse shock which causes an abnormal increase in demand for liquidity which cannot be met from an alternative source".

While the concept itself had been used previously, the term "lender of last resort" was supposedly first used in its current context by Sir Francis Baring, in his Observations on the Establishment of the Bank of England, which was published in 1797.

== Classical theory ==
Although Alexander Hamilton, in 1792, was the first policymaker to explain and implement a lender of last resort policy, the classical theory of the lender of last resort was mostly developed by two Englishmen in the 19th century: Henry Thornton and Walter Bagehot. Although some of the details remain controversial, their general theory is still widely acknowledged in modern research and provides a suitable benchmark. Thornton and Bagehot were mostly concerned with the reduction of the money supply. That was because they feared that the deflationary tendency caused by a reduction of the money supply could reduce the level of economic activity. If prices did not adjust quickly, it would lead to unemployment and a reduction in output. By keeping the money supply constant, the purchasing power remains stable during shocks. When there is a shock-induced panic, two things happen:

1. The depositors fear that they will not be able to convert their deposits into suitably safe liquid assets: in 19th-century Britain, that meant gold or Bank of England notes, the latter being a component of high-powered money. They increase the amount of cash they hold relative to deposits.
2. Banks, on the other hand, afraid of becoming illiquid, increase their reserves. Taken together, it reduces the money multiplier which, multiplied by the amount of base money, gives the money supply. This equation shows the relation:
  $$M = \quad \left \lbrack \frac{1+\frac{C}{D}}{\frac{C}{D} + \frac{R}{D}} \right \rbrack B$$
  where M is the money supply, B is the money base, C/D is the ratio of cash to deposits held by the public, and R/D is the ratio of reserves to deposits held by the banks. If the multiplier is reduced from a shock and the amount of base money is constant, the money supply will decrease as a consequence. Thornton and Bagehot, therefore, suggested that the lender of last resort should increase the money base to offset the reduction of the multiplier. That was meant to keep the money supply constant and prevent an economic contraction.

=== Thornton's foundations ===
Thornton first published An Enquiry into the Nature and Effects of the Paper Credit of Great Britain in 1802. His starting point was that only a central bank could perform the task of lender of last resort because it holds a monopoly in issuing bank notes. Unlike any other bank, the central bank has a responsibility towards the public to keep the money supply constant, thereby preventing negative externalities of monetary instability, such as unemployment, price instability, bank runs, and financial panic.

=== Bagehot's contribution ===
Bagehot was the second important contributor to the classical theory. In his book Lombard Street (1873), he mostly agreed with Thornton without ever mentioning him but also develops some new points and emphases. Bagehot advocates: "Very large loans at very high rates are the best remedy for the worst malady of the money market when a foreign drain is added to a domestic drain." His main points can be summarized by his famous rule: lend "it most freely... to merchants, to minor bankers, to 'this and that man', whenever the security is good".

=== Summary of the classical theory ===
Thomas M. Humphrey, who has done extensive research on Thornton's and Bagehot's works, summarizes their main proposals as follows: (1) protect the money supply instead of saving individual institutions; (2) rescue solvent institutions only; (3) let insolvent institutions default; (4) charge penalty rates; (5) require good collateral; and (6) announce the conditions before a crisis so that the market knows exactly what to expect.

Many of the points remain controversial today but it seems to be accepted that the Bank of England strictly followed these rules during the last third of the 19th century.

== Bank runs and contagion ==
Most industrialized countries have had a lender of last resort for many years. Models explaining why propose that a bank run or bank panic can arise in any fractional reserve banking system and that the lender of last resort function is a way of preventing panics from happening. The Diamond and Dybvig model of bank runs has two Nash equilibria: one in which welfare is optimal and one where there is a bank run. The bank run equilibrium is an infamously self-fulfilling prophecy: if individuals expect a run to happen, it is rational for them to withdraw their deposits early: before they actually need it. That makes them lose some interest, but that is better than losing everything from a bank run.

In the Diamond–Dybvig model, introducing a lender of last resort can prevent bank runs from happening so that only the optimal equilibrium remains. That is because individuals are no longer afraid of a liquidity shortage and so have no incentive to withdraw early. The lender of last resort will never come into action because the mere promise is enough to provide the confidence necessary to prevent a panic.

Subsequently, the model has been extended to allow for financial contagion: the spreading of a panic from one bank to another, by Allen and Gale, and Freixas et al. respectively.

Allen and Gale introduced an interbank market into the Diamond–Dybvig model to study contagion of bank panics from one region to another. An interbank market is created by banks because it insures them against a lack of liquidity at certain banks as long as the overall amount of liquidity is sufficient. Liquidity is allocated by the interbank market so that banks that have excess liquidity can provide this to banks that lack liquidity. As long as the total demand for liquidity does not exceed the supply, the interbank market will allocate liquidity efficiently and banks will be better off. However, if demand exceeds supply, it can have disastrous consequences. The interregional cross-holdings of deposits cannot increase the total amount of liquidity. Thus, long-term assets have to be liquidated, which causes loss.

The degree of contagion depends on the interconnectedness of the banks in different regions. In an incomplete market (banks do not exchange deposits with all other banks), a high degree of interconnectedness causes contagion. Contagion is not caused if the market is either complete (banks have exchanged deposits with all other banks) or if the banks are little-connected. In Allen and Gale's model, the role of the central bank is to complete the markets to prevent contagion.

Freixas et al.'s model is similar to the one by Allen and Gale, except that in Freixas et al.'s model, individuals face uncertainty about where they will need their money. There is a fraction of individuals (travelers) who need their money in a region other than home. Without a payment system, an individual has to withdraw his deposit early (when he finds out that he will need the money in a different place in the next period) and simply take the money along. That is inefficient because of the foregone interest payment. Banks therefore establish credit lines to allow individuals to withdraw their deposits in different regions. In the good equilibrium, welfare is increased just as in the Diamond–Dybvig model, but again there is a bank run equilibrium, too. It can arise if some individuals expect too many others to want to withdraw money in the same region in the next period. It is then rational to withdraw money early instead of not receiving any in the next period. It can happen even if all banks are solvent.

== Disputed matters ==
There is no universal agreement on whether a nation's central bank or any agent of private banking interests should be its lender of last resort. Nor is there on the pros and cons of actions such a lender takes and their consequences.

=== Moral hazard ===
Moral hazard has been an explicit concern in the context of the lender of last resort. It is argued, for example, that the existence of a LOLR facility leads to excessive risk-taking by both bankers and investors, which would be dampened if illiquid banks were allowed to fail. Therefore, the LOLR can alleviate current panics in exchange for increasing the likelihood of future panics by risk-taking induced by moral hazard.

That is exactly what the Report of the International Financial Institution Advisory Commission in 2000 accused the IMF of doing when it lends to emerging economies: "By preventing or reducing losses by international lenders, the IMF had implicitly signalled that, if local banks and other institutions incurred large foreign liabilities and government guaranteed private debts, the IMF would provide the foreign exchange needed to honour the guarantees." Investors are protected against the downside of their investment and, at the same time, receive higher interest rates to compensate them for their risk. That encourages risk-taking and reduces the necessary diversification and led the Commission to conclude, "The importance of the moral hazard problem cannot be overstated."

However, not having a lender of last resort for fear of moral hazard may have worse consequences than moral hazard itself. Consequently, many countries have a central bank that acts as lender of last resort. These countries then try to prevent moral hazard by other means such as suggested by Stern: "official regulation; encouragement for private sector monitoring and self-regulation; and the imposition of costs on those who make mistakes, including enforcement of bankruptcy procedures when appropriate." Some authors also suggest that moral hazard should not be a concern of the lender of last resort. The task of preventing it should be given to a supervisor or regulator that limits the amount of risk that can be taken.

=== Macro or micro responsibility ===
Whether or not the lender of last resort has a responsibility for saving individual banks has been a very controversial topic. Does the lender of last resort provide liquidity to the market as a whole (through open market operations) or should it (also) make loans to individual banks (through discount window lending)?

There are two main views on this question, the money and the banking view: the money view, as argued, for example, by Goodfriend and King, and Capie, suggests, that the lender of last resort should provide liquidity to the market by open market operations only because it suffices to limit panics. What they call "banking policy" (discount window lending) may even be harmful because of moral hazard. The banking view finds that in reality the market does not allocate liquidity efficiently in times of crisis. Liquidity provided through open market operations is not efficiently distributed among banks in the interbank market, and there is a case for discount window lending. In a well-functioning interbank market only solvent banks can borrow. However, if the market is not functioning, even solvent banks may be unable to borrow, most likely because of asymmetric information.

A model developed by Flannery suggests that the private market for interbank loans can fail if banks face uncertainty about the risk involved in lending to other banks. In times of crisis with less certainty, however, discount window loans are the least costly way of solving the problem of uncertainty.

Rochet and Vives extend the traditional banking view to provide more evidence that interbank markets indeed do not function properly as Goodfriend and King had suggested. "The main contribution of our paper so far has been to show the theoretical possibility of a solvent bank being illiquid, due to a coordination failure on the interbank market."

Goodhart proposes that only discount window lending should be considered lending of last resort. The reason is that central banks' open market operations cannot be separated from regular open market operations.

=== Distinction between illiquid and insolvent ===
According to Bagehot and, following him, many later writers the lender of last resort should not lend to insolvent banks. That is reasonable in particular because it would encourage moral hazard. The distinction seems logical and is helpful in theoretical models, but some authors find that in reality it is difficult to apply. Especially in times of crisis the distinction is difficult to make.

When an illiquid bank approaches the lender of last resort, there should always be a suspicion of insolvency. However, according to Goodhart, it is a myth that the central bank can evaluate that the suspicions are untrue under the usual constraints of time for arriving at a decision. Like Obstfeld he considers insolvency a possibility that arises with a certain amount of probability, not something that is certain.

=== Penalty rate and collateral requirement ===
Bagehot's reasoning behind charging penalty rates (i.e. higher rates than are available in the market) was as follows: (1) it would really make the lender of last resort the very last resort and (2) it would encourage the prompt repayment of the debt.

Some authors suggest that charging a higher rate does not serve the purpose of the lender of last resort because a higher rate could make it too expensive for banks to borrow. Flannery and others mention that the Fed has neither asked for good collateral nor charged rates above the market, in recent years.

=== Announcement in advance ===
If the central bank announces in advance that it will act as lender of last resort in future crises, it can be understood as a credible promise and prevent bank panics. At the same time, it may increase moral hazard. While Bagehot emphasized that the benefit of the promise outweighs the costs, many central banks have intentionally not promised anything.

=== Private alternatives ===
Before the founding of the US Federal Reserve System as lender of last resort, its role had been assumed by private banks. Both the clearing-house system of New York and the Suffolk Bank of Boston had provided member banks with liquidity during crises. In the absence of a public solution a private alternative had developed. Advocates of the free banking view suggest that such examples show that there is no necessity for government intervention.

The Suffolk Bank acted as lender of last resort during the Panic of 1837–1839. Rolnick, Smith and Weber "argue that the Suffolk Bank's provision of note-clearing and lender of last resort services (via the Suffolk Banking System) lessened the effects of the Panic of 1837 in New England relative to the rest of the country, where no bank provided such services."

During the Panic of 1857, a policy committee of the New York Clearing House Association (NYCHA) allowed the issuance of the so-called clearing-house loan certificates. While their legality was controversial at the time, the idea of providing additional liquidity eventually led to a public provision of this service that was to be performed by the central bank, founded in 1913.

Some authors view the establishment of clearing-houses as proof that the lender of last resort does not have to be provided by the central bank. Bordo agrees that it does not have to be a central bank. However, historical experience (mainly Canada and US) suggested to him that it has to be a public authority and not a private clearing-house association that provides the service.

== Historical experience ==
Miron, Bordo, Wood and Goodhart show that the existence of central banks has reduced the frequency of bank runs.

Miron uses data on the crises between 1890 and 1908 and compares it to the period of 1915 to 1933. That allows him to reject the hypothesis that after the new Federal Reserve acted as lender of last resort, the frequency of panics observed did not change. The conclusion of his discussion is that the "effects of monetary policy... that anticipated open market operations by the Fed probably had real effects."

Bordo analyses historical data by Schwartz and Kindleberger to determine whether a lender of last resort can prevent or reduce the effect of a panic or crisis. Bordo finds that Britain's last panic happened in 1866. Afterwards the Bank of England provided the necessary liquidity. According to Bordo, acting as a lender of last resort prevented panics in 1878, 1890, and 1914. Bordo concludes: "Successful lender of last resort actions prevented panics on numerous occasions. On those occasions when panics were not prevented, either the requisite institutions did not exist, or the authorities did not understand the proper actions to take. Most countries developed an effective LLR mechanism by the last one-third of the nineteenth century. The U.S. was the principal exception. Some public authority must provide the lender of last resort function.... Such an authority does not have to be a central bank. This is evident from the experience of Canada and other countries."

Wood compares the reaction of central banks to different crises in England, France, and Italy. When a lender of last resort existed, panics did not turn into crises. When the central bank failed to act, crises such as in France in 1848, however, happened. He concludes "that LOLR action contains a crisis, while absence of such action allows a localized panic to turn into a widespread banking crisis." More recent examples are the crises in Argentina, Mexico and Southeastern Asia. There, central banks could not provide liquidity because banks had been borrowing in foreign currencies, which the central bank was unable to provide.

=== Bank of England ===
The Bank of England is often considered the model lender of last resort because it acted according to the classical rules of Thornton and Bagehot. "Banking scholars agree that the Bank of England in the last third of the nineteenth century was the lender of last resort par excellence. More than any central bank before or since, it adhered to the strict classical or Thornton-Bagehot version of the LLR concept."

=== Federal Reserve System ===
The Federal Reserve System in the United States acts rather differently, and at least in some ways not in accordance with Bagehot's advice. Norbert J. Michel, a financial researcher, goes as far as saying that the Federal Reserve made the Great Depression worse by failing to fulfil its role of lender of last resort, a view shared amongst others by Milton Friedman. Critics like Michel nevertheless applaud the Fed's role as LLR in the crisis of 1987, and in that following 9/11, (though concerns about moral hazard resulting were certainly expressed at the time).

However, the Fed's role during the 2008 financial crisis continues to polarise opinion. The classical economist Thomas M. Humphrey has identified several ways in which the modern Fed deviates from the traditional rules: (1) "Emphasis on Credit (Loans) as Opposed to Money", (2) "Taking Junk Collateral", (3) "Charging Subsidy Rates", (4) "Rescuing Insolvent Firms Too Big and Interconnected to Fail", (5) "Extension of Loan Repayment Deadlines", (6) "No Pre-announced Commitment".

Indeed, some say its lender of last resort policies have jeopardized its operational independence, and have put taxpayers at risk.

Mervyn King however has pointed out that 21st century banking (and hence the Fed as well) operate in a very different world from that of Bagehot, creating new problems for the LLR role Bagehot envisaged, highlighting especially the danger that haircuts on collateral, punitive rates, and the stigma of the deposit window can precipitate a bank run, or exacerbate a credit crunch: "In extreme cases, the LOLR is the Judas kiss for banks forced to turn to the central bank for support". As a result, other strategies were called for, and were indeed pursued by the Fed. The historian Adam Tooze has stressed how the Fed's new liquidity facilities mapped onto the various elements of the eviscerated shadow banking system, thereby replacing a systemic failure of credit as LLR, (a role morphing perhaps into that of a dealer of last resort). Tooze concluded that "In its own terms, as a capitalist stabilization effort...the Fed was remarkably successful".

=== ECB ===
The European Central Bank arguably set itself up (controversially) as a conditional LOLR with its 2012 policy of Outright Monetary Transactions.

=== Prussia/Imperial Germany ===
In 1763, the king was the lender of last resort in Prussia; and in the 19th C., various official bodies, from the Prussian lottery to the Hamburg City Government, worked in consortia as LOLR. After unification, the financial crisis of 1873 forced the formation of the German Reichsbank (1876) to fulfil that role.

== International lender of last resort ==
=== Theory ===
The matter of whether there is a need for an international lender of last resort is more controversial than for a domestic lender of last resort. Most authors agree that there is a need for a national lender of last resort and argue only about the specific set-up. There is, however, no agreement on the international level. There are mainly two opposing groups: one (Capie and Schwartz) says that an international lender of last resort (ILOLR) is technically impossible, while the other (Fischer, Obstfeld, Goodhardt and Huang) wants a modified International Monetary Fund (IMF) to assume this role.

Fischer argues that financial crises have become more interconnected, which requires an international lender of last resort because domestic lenders cannot create foreign currency. Fischer says this role can and should be taken by the IMF even if it is not a central bank, since it has the ability to provide credit to the market irrespective of being unable to create new money in any "international currency". Fischer's central argument, that the ability to create money is not a necessary attribute of the lender of last resort, is highly controversial, and both Capie and Schwartz argue the opposite.

Goodhart and Huang developed a model arguing "the international contagious risk is much higher when there is an international interbank market than otherwise. Our analysis has indicated that an ILOLR can play a useful role in providing international liquidity and reducing such international contagion."

"A lender-of-last-resort is what it is by virtue of the fact that it alone provides the ultimate means of payment. There is no international money and so there can be no international lender-of-last-resort." That is the most prominent argument put against the international lender of last resort. Besides this point (considered "semantic" by opposing authors), Capie and Schwartz provide arguments for why the IMF is not fit to be an international lender of last resort.

Schwartz explains that the lender of last resort is not the optimal solution to the crises of today, and the IMF cannot replace the necessary government agencies. Schwartz considers a domestic lender of last resort suitable to stabilize the international financial system, but the IMF lacks the properties necessary for the role of an international lender of last resort.

=== Practice ===
Tooze has argued that, during and since the credit crunch, the dollar has extended its reach as a global reserve currency; and suggests further that, at the height of the crisis, through the Central bank liquidity swap lines, the Fed "assured the key players in the global system...there was one actor in the system that would cover marginal imbalances with an unlimited supply of dollar liquidity. That precisely was the role of the global lender of last resort". Concern as to whether the Fed is in a position to repeat its role as global LOLR is one of the forces behind calls for a formal global currency.

== In government bond markets ==
Although the European Central Bank (ECB) has supplied large amounts of liquidity through both open market operations and lending to individual banks in 2008, it was hesitant to supply liquidity during the sovereign crisis of 2010. According to Paul De Grauwe, the ECB should be the lender of last resort in the government bond market and supply liquidity to its member countries just as it does to the financial sector. That is because the reasons that the lender of last resort is necessary in the banking sector can be applied to the government bond market analogously. Just like banks that lend long-term while borrowing short-term, governments have highly illiquid assets like infrastructure and maturing debt. If they do not succeed in rolling over their debt, they become illiquid just as banks that run out of liquidity and are not supported by a lender of last resort. The distrust of investors can then increase the rates the government has to pay on its debt, which, in a self-fulfilling way, leads to a solvency crisis. Because banks hold the greatest proportion of government debt, not saving the government may make it necessary to save the banks, in turn. "The single most important argument for mandating the ECB to be a lender of last resort in the government bond markets is to prevent countries from being pushed into a bad equilibrium."

Arguments put forth against a lender of last resort in the government bond market are the following: (1) inflation risk from an increase in the money supply; (2) losses to taxpayers because in the end they bear the losses of the ECB; (3) moral hazard: governments have an incentive to take more risk; (4) Bagehot's rule of not lending to insolvent institutions; and (5) violation of the statutes of the ECB, which do not allow the ECB to buy government bonds directly.

According to De Grauwe, none of the arguments is valid for the following reason: (1) The money supply does not necessarily increase if the money base is increased. (2) All open market operations generate taxpayer risk, and if the lender of last resort is successful in preventing countries from moving into the bad equilibrium, it will not suffer any losses. (3) The risk of moral hazard is identical to the moral hazard in the financial market and should be overcome by risk-limiting regulation. (4) If the distinction between illiquid and insolvent were possible, the market would not need the support of the lender of last resort, but in practice, the distinction cannot be made. (5) While Article 21 of the treaty prohibits buying debt from national governments directly because it "implies a monetary financing of the government budget deficit", Article 18 allows the ECB to buy and sell "marketable instruments", and government bonds are marketable instruments. Finally, De Grauwe asserts that only the central bank itself has the necessary credibility to act as a lender of last resort and so it should replace the European Financial Stability Facility (and its successor, the European Stability Mechanism). The two institutions cannot guarantee that they will always possess enough liquidity or "fire power" to buy debt from sovereign bond holders.

== See also ==
- Central bank
- Chicago plan
- Liquidity trap
- Liquidity
- Financial panic
- International lender of last resort
