= Richard Down =

British banker (1736–1814)

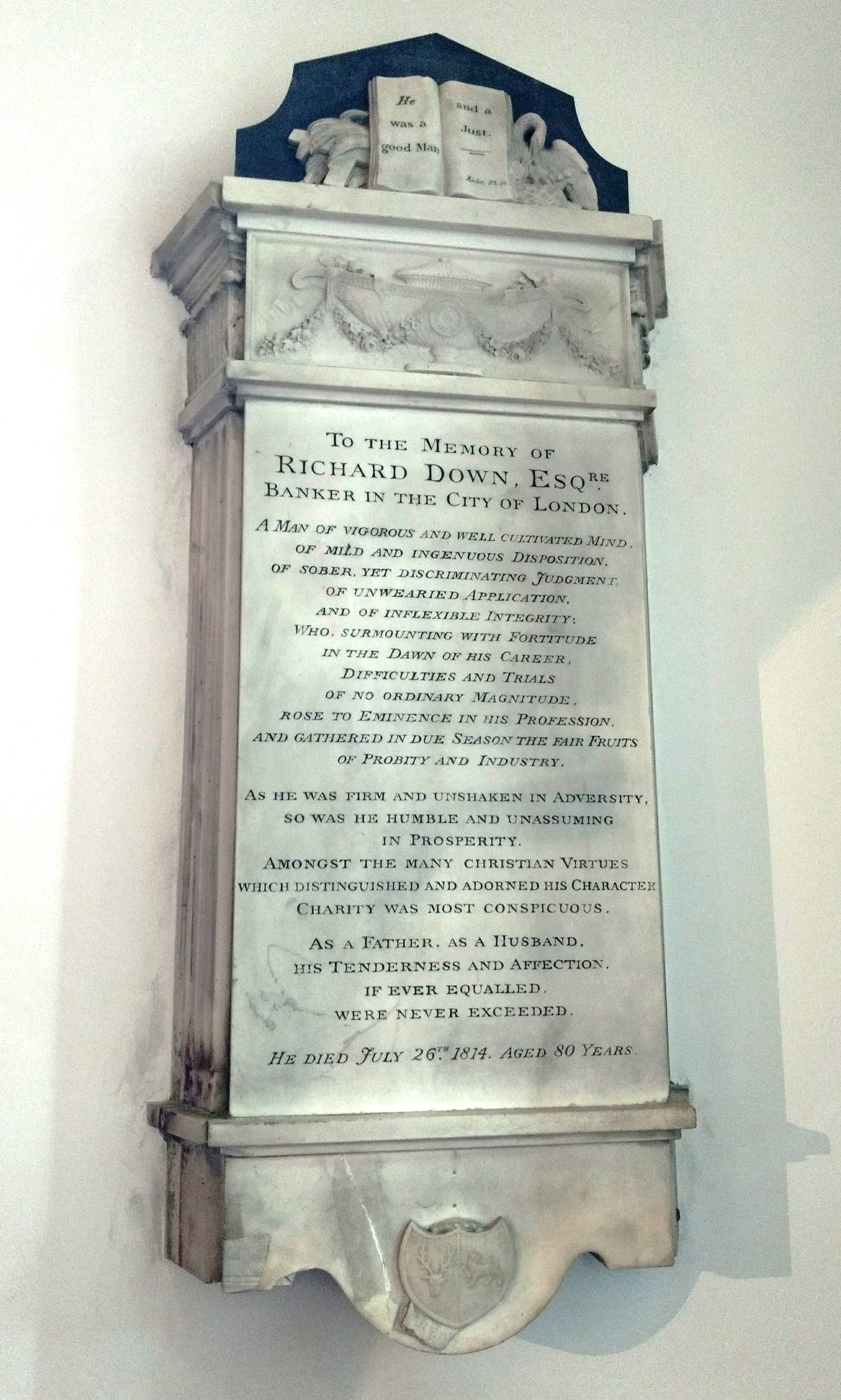
The memorial to Richard Down, St James the Great, Friern Barnet.

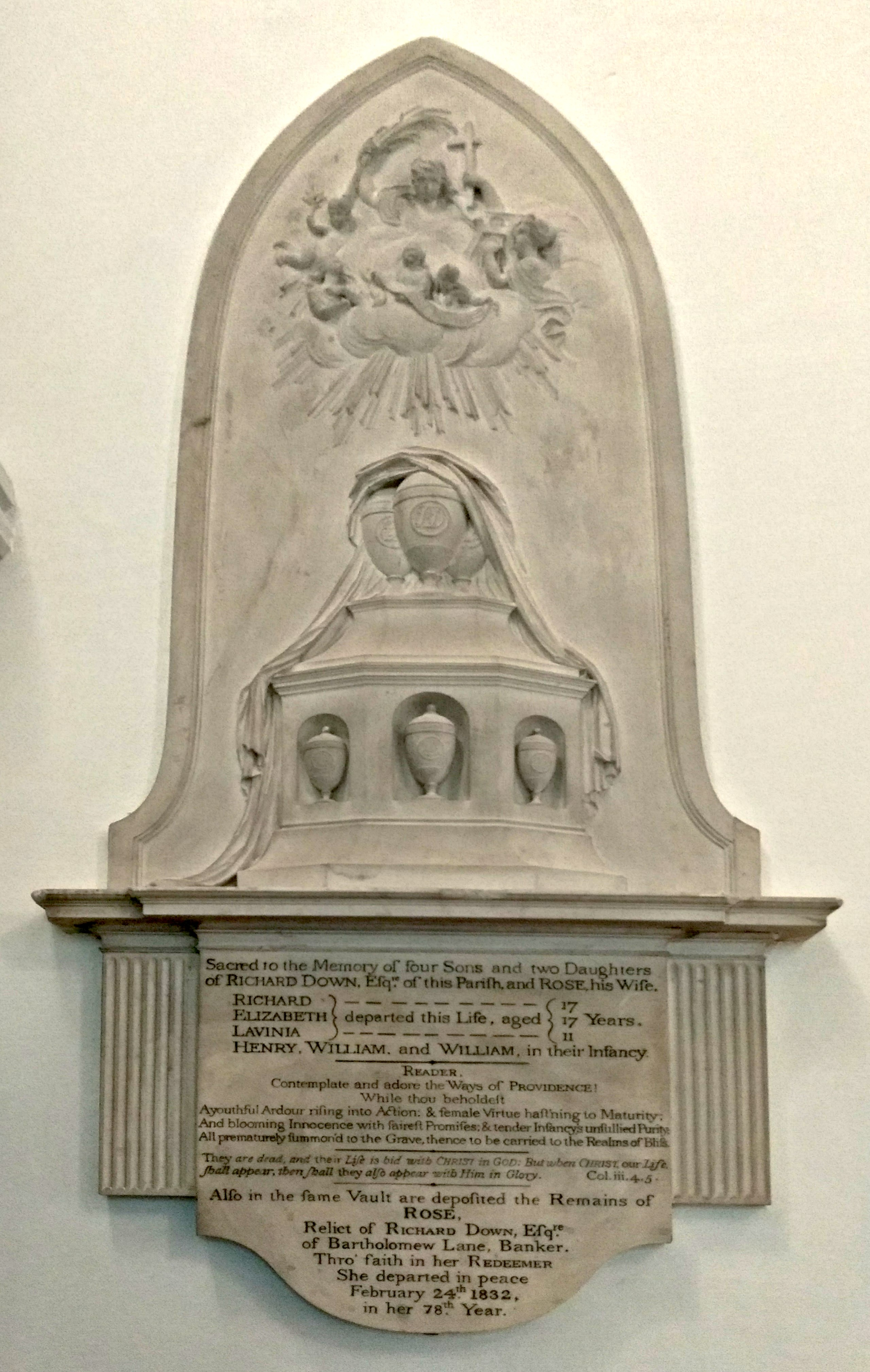
The monument to Richard Down's children at St James the Great.

Richard Down (10 April 1736 – 26 July 1814) was an English banker of Bartholomew Lane in the City of London.

== Early life and family ==
Richard Down was born on 10 April 1736 in Tiverton, Devon, the son of Richard Down. In 1772, he married Rose Neale at St James the Great, Friern Barnet. Rose was the daughter of Henry Neale, the former owner of Halliwick Manor who lost the manor house when he was made bankrupt.

== Career ==
Down was a partner in the prominent city bank firm Down, Thornton & Free, with Henry Thornton being one of the other partners. After their deaths the bank continued to trade as Pole, Thornton, Free, Down & Scott, retaining their surnames.

== Death and legacy ==
Down died on 26 July 1814 at his house in Colney Hatch, aged 78 and was buried at St Bartholomew-by-the-Exchange, as was his wife Rose in 1832, and five of their children. Upon demolition of that church in 1840, the coffins and monuments were transferred to St James the Great, Friern Barnet. Down is memorialised in a plaque at the east end of the aisle inside the choir vestry. His wife and six of his children are additionally memorialised there in a plaque by the sculptor John Bacon the younger.

His will is held by the British National Archives at Kew.
