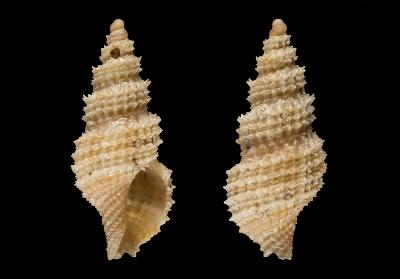
- Shell of Raphitoma pseudohystrix (specimen at MNHN, Paris)

Scientific classification
- Kingdom: Animalia
- Phylum: Mollusca
- Class: Gastropoda
- Subclass: Caenogastropoda
- Order: Neogastropoda
- Superfamily: Conoidea
- Family: Raphitomidae
- Genus: Raphitoma
- Species: R. pseudohystrix

Binomial name
- Raphitoma pseudohystrix (Sykes, 1906)

Synonyms
- Defrancia hystrix Jeffreys, 1867; Clathurella pseudohystrix Sykes, 1906; Raphitoma divae Carrozza, 1984

= Raphitoma pseudohystrix =

Species of gastropod

Raphitoma pseudohystrix is a species of sea snail, a marine gastropod mollusk in the family Raphitomidae.

== Distribution ==
- European waters
- Grecian Exclusive Economic Zone
- Western, Central Mediterranean and Adriatic. The records from Greece seem due to a misidentification.
