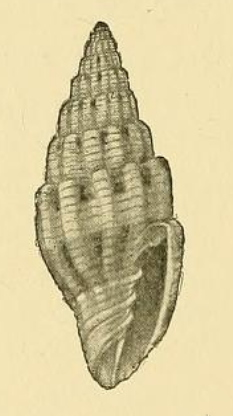
- Drawing of a shell of Vexillum dilectissimum (holotype)

Scientific classification
- Kingdom: Animalia
- Phylum: Mollusca
- Class: Gastropoda
- Subclass: Caenogastropoda
- Order: Neogastropoda
- Superfamily: Turbinelloidea
- Family: Costellariidae
- Genus: Vexillum
- Species: V. dilectissimum

Binomial name
- Vexillum dilectissimum (Melvill & Sykes, 1899)

Synonyms
- Mitra (Costellaria) dilectissima Melvill & Sykes, 1899 (basionym); Mitra dilectissima Melvill & Sykes, 1899 (original combination); Vexillum (Costellaria) dilectissimum (Melvill & Sykes, 1899)

= Vexillum dilectissimum =

Species of gastropod

Vexillum dilectissimum is a species of small sea snail, marine gastropod mollusk in the family Costellariidae, the ribbed miters.

== Description ==
The length of the shell attains 25.6 mm.

(Original description) The white shell is fusiform. The spire tapers towards the apex. The solid whorls are gradate, impressed at the sutures, nine or ten in number. They are longitudinally costate, the ribs being thick, shining, whitish, smooth, with interstitial transverse deep sulcation. The shell is painted with chestnut-ochre spotting at the interstices, just below the sutures, the lower part of the upper whorls being plain. The body whorl has a white band towards the middle, the chestnut-ochre suffusion extending thence over the base, which is attenuate. The aperture is narrow and oblong. The outer lip is simple. The columella is straight and four-plaited.

== Distribution ==
This marine species occurs off the Andaman and Nicobar Islands and Thailand.
