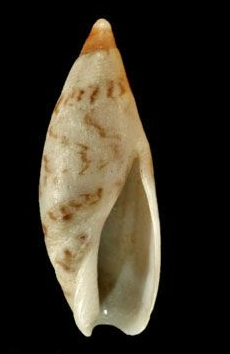
- Shell of Amalda booleyi (specimen at the Natural History Museum, Rotterdam)

Scientific classification
- Kingdom: Animalia
- Phylum: Mollusca
- Class: Gastropoda
- Subclass: Caenogastropoda
- Order: Neogastropoda
- Family: Ancillariidae
- Genus: Amalda
- Species: A. booleyi

Binomial name
- Amalda booleyi (Melvill & Sykes, 1896)

Synonyms
- Ancilla booleyi Melvill & Sykes, 1897 (original combination)

= Amalda booleyi =

Species of gastropod

Amalda booleyi is a species of sea snail, a marine gastropod mollusk in the family Ancillariidae, commonly known as olive shells or ancillariids. This species was originally described from the Andaman Islands in the Indian Ocean.

== Description ==
The shell of Amalda booleyi attains a length of 12.5 mm.

== Distribution ==
This marine species occurs off the Andaman Islands.

== Taxonomy ==
Amalda booleyi was originally described as Ancilla booleyi by James Cosmo Melvill and Ernest Ruthven Sykes in 1897, based on specimens collected from the Andaman Islands. It is named after G. H. Booley, who discovered it.
