= International lender of last resort =

Facility for emergency global liquidity

International lender of last resort (ILLR) is a facility prepared to act when no other lender is capable or willing to lend in sufficient volume to provide or guarantee liquidity in order to avert a sovereign debt crisis or a systemic crisis. No effective international lender of last resort currently exists.

The role and suggested functions of an ILLR in a crisis are like a domestic lender of last resort but one at an international level that can bail out one or several countries. A number of different proposals and structures have been suggested and some have been implemented but with limited success. One such example is the International Monetary Fund's supplemental reserve facility (SRF). Some suggested ILLRs have been limited to supranational regions such as the Eurozone where agreements and funding are easier to achieve.

== Antecedents, current arrangements, and related proposals ==
Calls for an ILLR arose following the Mexican crisis (1994–1995) and the Asian and Russian financial crises of the late 1990s. While no comprehensive mechanism has been implemented, in late 1997 the International Monetary Fund instituted the supplemental reserve facility (SRF), designed to make large short-term loans with policy conditions at penalty rates during crises. To date, only Korea, Russia and Brazil have made use of the SRF.

Other less than comprehensive mechanisms have been proposed but not adopted. The first is International or Sovereign Bankruptcy, which would impose a stay on payments by a country in crisis. The second involves the use of credit lines for sovereigns to draw upon in times of crisis. A flexible credit line (FCL) would be made available with few or no conditions to countries with very sound economic and financial policies, while a precautionary credit line (PCL) could be made available to countries that do not meet FCL criteria but nonetheless display essentially sound policies. In contrast to FCL provisions, countries drawing on the PCL would be subject to policy conditions. A third proposal, broader and less clearly defined, calls for a global stabilization mechanism whereby the IMF could temporarily use an expanded "tool kit," with instruments including the unilateral offer of FCLs for multiple qualifying countries as well as other special facilities and relaxations of the terms of existing facilities.

== Rationales ==
A variety of rationales have been offered for the creation of an ILLR. Particularly prominent in recent years is offering countries an alternative to self-insurance through accumulation of foreign exchange reserves, which, in spite of a high cost of carry, has been widely practiced in emerging economies since the 1997 Asian financial crisis, the 1998 Russian financial crisis and the 1998 bailout of Long-Term Capital Management. An ILLR might also provide a cushion against shocks and volatility, as well as reduce the likelihood of financial panic within countries and financial contagion across countries. Moreover, an ILLR might allow a country's Central Bank to shift their holdings from liquid but low-yielding foreign exchange reserve to less liquid but longer-term and higher-yield assets. Finally, having an ILLR with established rules and procedures in place before a crisis might make collective action problems less likely than in the case of an exclusively ex post response.

== Proposals and characteristics ==
The role and suggested functions of an ILLR in a crisis like domestic lender of last resort, as set forth by Walter Bagehot and subsequent authors, are the following: i) lending against any marketable collateral (finance) valued at its value in normal times; ii) lending in large amounts (on demand) at terms steeper than at market terms in normal times; and iii) establish the above principles ex-ante and applying them automatically. The functions of an ILLR could be undertaken by a new institution such as a global central bank, but current proposals have generally suggested the creation of a fund or facility within an existing institution, particularly the International Monetary Fund. A leading role has also occasionally been suggested for the Bank for International Settlements. Less consensus exists on whether an ILLR should additionally assume the functions of a crisis manager by coordinating the responses of other relevant actors. Disagreement likewise exists regarding whether an ILLR should directly provide international liquidity to a country's financial institutions or should only provide liquidity to institutions serving as a country's financial safety nets.
Based on the traditional doctrine, four desirable aspects of a feasible ILLR can be set forth:

- Large size: Sufficient to meet short-term financial obligations and avoid a collapse (either of demand or supply);
- Expediency: Timely, immediate disbursements to prevent crises rather than cure their consequences or, if already underway, mitigate and resolve them at minimum cost;
- Certainty: Automatic (i.e., non-discretionary) financial assistance according to pre-arranged mechanisms and conditions with adequate repayment period to match extraordinary financial need; uncertainty undermines confidence that ILLR will do its job, leads to defensive positioning of stakeholders in anticipation of crisis and, therefore, breeds self-fulfilling crises.
- An exit strategy: Constant monitoring of whether liquidity provision fails to restore normalcy or fundamentals continue to deteriorate in order to be prepared to change diagnosis on the nature of the financial crisis and switch to alternative interventions to strengthen solvency.

There are, in addition, important distinctive characteristics of a feasible ILLR to bear in mind:

- Financial safeguards: In the absence of actual collateral or legal senior creditor status, ILLR financial safety needs a reliable, satisfactory country risk assessment;
- Ex ante eligibility: In the absence of prudential regulation and other legally binding assurances, ILLR needs to resort to the satisfaction of conditions. In order to be expedient and certain, eligibility conditions (including the above risk assessment) ought to be set ex ante, in normal times.
- Standards for eligibility: Conditions for eligibility require minimum standards to comply with the financial safeguards mentioned above and standards of country economic health depending on the objective of the particular application of the ILLR (concerning the soundness of fundamentals, the quality of the policies in place and the degree of commitment to sustain them). In all cases, criteria should be parsimonious, easily quantifiable and as objective as possible.
- Participation incentives: Because of the absence of a mandatory legal framework, if countries are reluctant to make individual applications for protection under the ILLR in normal times, the integrity of the safety net will require proactive participation promotion.

Any ILLR arrangement assumes a high level of trust and cooperation among international financial actors. Reserve asset countries, for example, would be expected to provide liquidity on demand to the ILLR. That liquidity would in turn be drawn from a network of Central Bank swaps and other reliable sources, including regional arrangements in a position to co-finance and committed to fulfilling their obligations. Trust and cooperation would also be implicit in the function of channeling liquidity to qualified countries.

== Criticisms ==
The greatest single objection to ILLR is fear of moral hazard, as access to a liquidity facility may lead countries to opt for bolder policies with less liquidity self-protection (e.g. lower reserves) and, in the event of a liquidity crisis, to choose to incur debt from the ILLR to avoid default on private debts and preserve creditworthiness. In addition, private risk-taking as well as public risk-taking might increase in a setting characterized by a combination of inadequate macro-prudential regulation and the elimination of systemic risk.

A variety of more specific objections have arisen as well:

- An ILLR cannot provide genuine liquidity support in the absence of a supra-national money, nor can it create money
- No fiscal or taxing authority exists to finance the operations of an ILLR
- The amount of hard currency needed to support an ILLR would be unrealistically large
- An ILLR would lack access to mechanisms and instruments, such as deposit insurance, that are used by national lenders of last resort
- Whether an ILLR would channel funds to domestic authorities or to domestic banks remains unclear, and in either case agency problems could arise
- Regardless of an ILLR's hypothetical benefits, nations are in practice unlikely to yield the degree of control over their banking sectors that would be necessary to make an ILLR functional

== See also ==
- Euro area crisis
- Asset–liability mismatch
- Balance of payments
- Currency crisis
- Domestic liability dollarization
- Emerging market
- External debt
- Government bond
- Government debt
- Systemically important financial institution
