= Joseph John Jefferson =

Congregationalist pastor (1795–1882)

Joseph John Jefferson (1795–1882), usually referred to as John Jefferson, was a British Congregationalist minister and advocate for Christian pacifism.

== Biography ==
Historian Martin Ceadel asserts that Jefferson's pacifist position was most likely inspired by one of his congregants named John Scott. Scott died in 1832 and as minister for the Independent Meeting House at Stoke Newington, Jefferson delivered the eulogy. Jefferson was elected as secretary of the London Peace Society on 11 August 1840. In 1845, he spoke publicly in a series of lectures in London sponsored by the Society along with George Thompson, Henry Richard, and John Scoble. The lecture series was attended by a total of 64,000 people. Jefferson hoped they would spread Christian pacifism, specifically opposition to all wars as a Christian principle. In 1846, he was one of the first sixty signers of the League of Universal Brotherhood Pledge, along with Joseph Sturge and James Silk Buckingham. He was also active within the Congregational Union and the London Missionary Society. He retired suddenly as secretary of the Peace Society on 4 January 1848 due to poor health, but shortly afterwards in May 1848 he was made vice-president of the Society. He lived for another 34 years and remained an inactive vice-president until his death in 1882. Jefferson served as the minister for Abney Park Chapel and cemetery in Stoke Newington for more than a quarter of a century.

== Works ==
- Jefferson, J. (1828). The Vanity of Man. A sermon [on Ps. xxxix. 5] preached in ... Andover, February 10 ... Occasioned by the ... death of W. Pitman Junr. ... and of Mrs. Smith, his sister, who both died on the second inst (Second ed.). London: Andover.
- Jefferson, J. (1832). An Antidote to Sudden Fear: Or, the calmness in which Christians may contemplate the threatening pestilence. A discourse [on Prov. iii. 25], etc. London: Westley and Davis.
- Jefferson, J. (1832). The Aged Christian ripe for glory. A sermon [on Mark iv. 29] ... occasioned by the death of Mr John Scott, etc. London.
- Jefferson, J. (1832). The Unlawfulness of War: A Discourse [on Luke ii. 14], etc. London.
- Jefferson, J. (1833). The official glory of the Son of God; or a treatise on the universal headship of Christ. London.
- Jefferson, J. (1834). A Companion for the Closet, or, the way to keep the heart right with God. London.
- Jefferson, J. (1834). Prophecies directly relating to the Messiah: And their exact fulfilment in the person and ministry of Jesus Christ. A discourse [on Acts x. 43]. Stoke Newington: D. Herbert.
- Jefferson, J. (1835). Eminent usefulness assured of a glorious reward: A sermon [on Dan. xii. 13] occasioned by the death of R. Morrison, etc. London.
- Jefferson, J. (1838). Ministerial Separation. A charge delivered ... at the Ordination of the Rev. R. Hamilton, etc. London: T. Ward.
- Jefferson, J. (1839). The Millennium a spiritual state, not a personal reign. London.
- Jefferson, J. (1841). Agrippa: Or, the Nominal Christian invited to consideration and decision. London.
- Jefferson, J. (1842). These Times: A tract for the Young; showing the claims which religious truth has upon their attention and zeal. London.
- Jefferson, J. (1843). The Proceedings of the first General Peace Convention held in London, June 1843. London: Peace Society.
- Jefferson, J. (1844). Truth and Duty: An appeal to British youth on the present claims of Christianity; being the substance of three discourses, etc. London.
- Jefferson, J. (1852). The Funeral of Wellington, its lessons for this world and the next. A sermon [on Psal. xlix. 16, 17]. London: Stoke Newington.
- Jefferson, J. (1863). Funeral oration [on Dr. Bennett].
- Jefferson, J. (n.d.). The salvation of infants: A sermon on Mark x. 14.
