= Jonathan Dymond =

British philosopher

Jonathan Dymond (1796–1828) was an English Quaker and an ethical philosopher who is known for his monograph An Enquiry into the Accordancy of War with the Principles of Christianity.

== Life ==
Jonathan Dymond was the son of a Quaker linen-draper of Exeter, England. Both his parents were 'Recorded Ministers' of the Society of Friends. He had little formal education but used his time off from working in his father's shop to read and to write essays on religious and moral problems, as well as composing poetry. He determined that he should devote his energies to 'the honour of advocating peace'. In his view war was "an evil before which, in my estimation, slavery sinks into insignificance". In 1825 he attended the annual meeting of the Peace Society in London and went on to help set up a branch of that society in Exeter. He soon had to withdraw from taking an active part due to his failing health.

On 6th May 1828, age 31, Jonathan Dymond died of tuberculosis.

== Works ==
Three works by Dymond have been published, two during his lifetime, the Inquiry and the Observations, and one posthumously, the Essays. A collection of his published and unpublished letters, poems and writings was made in 1911 by Charles William Dymond.

- An inquiry into the Accordancy of War with the Principles of Christianity, and an Examination of the Philosophical Reasoning by which it is defended: with Observations on Some of the Causes of War and Some of Its Effects. 1823 in England [Philadelphia 1834] [British Library 001023068]
- Observations on the Applicability of the Pacifist Principles of the New Testament on the Conduct of States, and on the Limitations which those principles impose on the Rights of Self-defence. London Peace Society Tract No. VII, 1825 [British Library #001023074]
- Essays on the Principles of Morality, and on the Private and Political Rights and Obligations of Mankind. In two volumes, Hamilton, Adams & Co, 1829 [British Library #001023056]
- Memoir, letters and poems of Jonathan Dymond : with bibliographical supplements: Charles William Dymond: privately printed, Bristol, 1911 [British Library # 007585688]

== Views ==
He was anxious to collaborate with other pacifists and near pacifists in an interdenominational peace movement and opposed any talk of confining the Quaker peace effort within their own ranks. His spirit was in no way sectarian: he welcomed all who wished to work sincerely for peace and it was as much for non-Quakers and for Quakers that he composed his works on the subject.

In his works Dymond extended the pacifist argument against war beyond the purely Christian insight of earlier generations of Quakers to wider more rationalist arguments, as in this against the notion of a distinction between aggressive and defensive war from the Inquiry:

When nations are mutually exasperated, and armies are levied, and battles fought, does not every one know that with whatever motives of defence one party may have begun the contest, both in turn become aggressors? In the fury of slaughter soldiers do not attend, they cannot attend, to questions of aggression. Their business is destruction, and their business they will perform. If the army of defence obtains success, it soon becomes an army of aggression. Having repelled the invader, it begins to punish him. If a war has once begun, it is vain to talk of distinctions of aggression and defence. Moralists may talk of distinctions, but soldiers will make none; and none can be made: it is outside the limits of possibility.

Dymond was a fervent antimilitarist. He saw armies as enemies of liberty and physical and moral subjection as a necessary condition of army life. The opinion he voiced prefigures some of the later objections to conscription made by Quakers and other conscientious objectors.

The soldier is compelled to obey, whatever be his inclination or his will. Being in the service, he has but one alternative – submission to arbitrary power, or punishment – the punishment of death perhaps, – for refusing to submit. Let the reader imagine himself in any other cause or purpose for which freemen shall be subjected to such a condition, and he then see that condition in its proper light. The influence of habit and the gloss of public opinion makes situations that would otherwise be loathsome and revolting, not only tolerable but pleasurable. Take away this influence and this gloss from the situation of a soldier, and what should we call it? We should call it a state of degradation and bondage.

== See also ==
- Quaker history
- Quakers
- Quakers in Britain
- Pacifism
- Peace education
- Peace Society
- Peace Testimony
