= Henry Sykes Thornton =

Henry Sykes Thornton

Henry Sykes Thornton (1800–1881) was an English banker, son of Henry Thornton (1760–1815). He was elected a Fellow of the Royal Society in 1834.

== Early life and Clapham Sect background ==
Thornton (born 28 May 1800) was the eldest son and second child of banker and reformer, Henry Thornton and his wife Marianne Sykes; Marianne Thornton was his elder sister. He was born into the Clapham Sect, a group of evangelical Anglicans also noted as abolitionists. The family home was Battersea Rise, on the west side of Clapham Common in Surrey.

Thornton was educated at Harrow School. In 1818 he matriculated at Trinity College, Cambridge, graduating B.A. in 1822, M.A. in 1825. Here, he began what was to become a lifelong friendship with Thomas Babington Macaulay, the son of another member of the Clapham Sect, Zachary Macaulay. He retained his evangelical contacts, playing a part in 1847, via Robert John Eden, in the appointment of Charles Perry as the first Bishop of Melbourne.

== Career ==
Thornton went into banking on the advice of his uncle Daniel Sykes. In 1822 he started work at his late father's bank, Pole, Thornton, Free, Down & Scott, at the time prospering. Thomas Joplin, in hindsight, thought it one of the biggest banking firms in London. The partners were Edward Down, Peter Free, Sir Peter Pole, 2nd Baronet and John Scott. In 1825, as a partner, he found that the bank was "heavily compromised by poor investments". In early December of that year, it failed in the Panic of 1825. John Horsley Palmer after the event was of the view that the banking issue was over-investment in illiquid securities, given the resources of the partners. The anonymous author "A Manufacturer" of an 1826 pamphlet sought to lay the blame on Henry Thornton the elder.

At this point Thornton had help with his career from friends of his father. He joined the partnership of a new bank, Williams, Deacon, Labouchere & Co. It arose from the collapse of another City of London bank, of Birchin Lane, the former Raymond, Williams, Vere, Lowe & Fletcher. Thornton became a named partner there in 1828. The plan to form a new Birchin Street bank was put together swiftly in December 1825, to bring together Charles Williams of the failed Williams, Williams, Burgess & Williams and Thornton. Backing was found from the Baring family, who brought in also John Deacon who had been a Barings Bank partner; John Melville who was a cousin of Thornton, and John Peter Labouchere of Hope & Co.

Thornton remained with the bank, until his death in 1881.

== Family ==
In 1878 Charles Shore, 2nd Baron Teignmouth wrote in his Reminiscences that Thornton "alone retains the house in which his father resided", Battersea Rise. The wording is careful in the light of a family rift caused by his marriage with a deceased wife's sister.

Thornton married firstly, in 1833, Harriet Maria Dealtry, daughter of William Dealtry. After her death in 1840, leaving children, he married secondly, in 1853, her sister Emily. Under the Marriage Act 1835 there could be no such valid marriage carried out in the United Kingdom. Thornton campaigned unsuccessfully for a change in the law. Ultimately, the couple went abroad for the marriage. The family fallout is described in Marianne Thornton by E. M. Forster, Thornton's great-nephew.

There were two daughters of Thornton's first marriage:

- Harriet Thornton, married in 1855 Robert Ruthven Pym, a banker and philanthropist, son of Francis Pym (1790–1860) and grandson of Francis Pym (1756–1833) MP. The couple, who both died in January 1894, had two daughters.
- Emily Thornton (died 1902), married in 1858 Cam Sykes: a cousin marriage. They had two sons, Henry Joseph Sykes (born 1861) and Ernest Ruthven Sykes (born 1867). Cam Sykes (1827–1910) served in the Crimean War and reached the rank of major. He was later a banker and magistrate.

There was also a son, Henry Charles Sykes.

The youngest daughter, from the second marriage, was Emily Mildred Thornton. She married in 1885 Charles Guy Pym. The two elder daughters were Anna Maria and Florence Emily, who made a cousin marriage in 1877 to Percy Thornton. Anna Maria was an invalid, put in the care of Horace Dobell at Bournemouth, where she died in 1885 at age 30.
