= Paper Credit =

Economics book

An Enquiry into the Nature and Effects of the Paper Credit of Great Britain
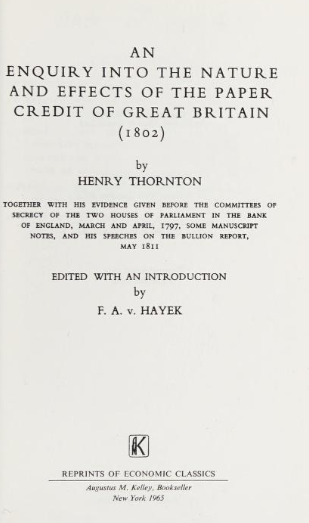
- 1965 reprint of An Enquiry into the Nature and Effects of the Paper Credit of Great Britain with introduction by economist F.A. Hayek
- Author: Henry Thornton
- Language: English
- Genre: Economics, Philosophy
- Publisher: J. Hatchard and Messrs. F. and C. Rivington
- Publication date: 1802
- Publication place: London

An Enquiry into the Nature and Effects of the Paper Credit of Great Britain, generally shortened to Paper Credit, is a book on monetary theory in economics, written by Henry Thornton and published in Britain in 1802. It is seen as prescient of modern monetary problems, having addressed paper currency, risk of inflation, and other issues that were appearing as certificates began to displace gold as currency in early 19th century Britain.

== History ==
During that period, monetary theory was largely stagnant, although monetary technology was still advancing. One result of this was a cycle of boom and bust that occurred about once per decade between 1760 and 1800. The last ground-breaking paper on monetary theory was Joseph Harris' Essay on Money and Coins, printed in 1757, and still seen as a primary source of money theory in Thornton's time.

In the same period, country banks in England had become more common, while the Bank of England had stopped printing certificates and become a sort of Lender of Last Resort to other banks, much like the Federal Reserve would in the 20th century in the US. Unfortunately, it was still rather new to this role, and its results varied wildly. Its response to the crisis brought about by a new war with France in the 1790s was to suddenly contract credit right when it was needed, causing an economic crisis only reduced when the government stepped in and mandated that its activities be resumed.

After a series of similarly disastrous collisions between the wartime government and the Bank of England during the rest of the decade, Parliament began setting up committees to examine the problem and suggest solutions. Thornton was on one such committee in 1797. He had already been working on a book examining the impact of paper money on the British economy for a year and appears to have used his work on the committee to help complete it over the next several years.

During this time, Walter Boyd published a paper arguing that irresponsible printing of paper money by the Bank of England was causing many of England's financial woes. While Thornton agreed in part, he considered Boyd's analysis simplistic and exaggerated, and his book became a more evenhanded answer to its attacks.

This history made the publication of his book in 1802 of great interest, positioning it as the next major work in monetary theory.

== The Book ==
Thornton opens his book by explaining his intentions in publishing it. "THE first intention of the Writer of the following pages was merely to expose some popular errors which related chiefly to the suspension of the cash payments· of the Bank of England, and to the influence of our paper currency on the price of provisions." But he goes on to say that this original plan had now expanded into that of an economic treatise, describing it this way:

The first Chapter contains a few preliminary observations on commercial credit. The object of the two following Chapters is distinctly to describe the several kinds of paper credit; to lay down some general principles respecting it; and, in particular, to point out the important consequences which result from the different degrees of rapidity in the circulation of different kinds of circulating medium, and also in the circulation of the same medium at different periods of time.

In Paper Credit of Great Britain, Thornton first examines the damage caused by the contraction of money supply and credit. He discusses the factors that can cause people to "hold money", reducing what he calls "rapidity of circulation", now known as monetary velocity, and how that can exacerbate a contraction of money supply (which would now be called a deflationary spiral). He says that people may become more likely to hold on to money and liquefiable assets as their confidence in the economy declines, creating a "loss sustained" in economic activity.

All of this anticipated much more advanced monetary theory a century later, proving a basis for classical economics and Austrian school monetary theory well into the 20th century.

Thornton also explains the function of the Bank of England in great detail, including why it printed paper money, and how that was regulated, with the impact of both currency excess and shortage.

Paper Credit also examines the likely impact of inflating the supply of money faster than demand, and even what would a century later be known as purchasing power parity: the impact of the relative conditions of two nations' economies on trade and money between them.

Likewise, Thornton identifies the "stimulus" effect of printing excess money, including its harmful side-effect of what the Austrians would later call malinvestment, as one industry's exaggerated demand drew money or workers from other, potentially more important sectors.

Most famously, Thornton then examines the function and impact of foreign currency exchanges on money. He notes that the excessive expansion of paper money in an economy causes a "drain" of gold out of a country.

Thornton explained the reason for the failure of an attempt in the early 1700s by John Law, to make widespread use of paper money in France: "He forgot that there might be no bounds to the demand for paper; that the increasing quantity would contribute to the rise of commodities: and the price of commodities require, and seem to justify, a still further increase."

== The impact ==
Before the publication of Paper Credit, Walter Boyd's competing idea was dominant. This was completely displaced by Thornton's new, self-published book, making it the basis for monetary policy discussion going forward.

Not only were these various arguments fundamental to later works by Ricardo and John Stuart Mill, but even came to be seen as superior to its own predecessors. Ricardo, for example, assumed that inflation could only cause problems, instead of being a symptom of other things. Mill later moved back to Thornton's position of seeing inflation and gold flight as sometimes being caused by trade imbalances.

In fact, a century later, the neoclassical economics and Austrian school of economics both continued to draw from Paper Credit, or else to reinvent the same positions. It was cited by Friedrich Hayek as an important influence, in fact he wrote the foreword for the 1939 reprint.
