= International Peace Society =

Former pacifist organisation in the UK

- Society for the Promotion of Permanent and Universal Peace
- Formation: 14 June 1816
- Founded at: London, England
- Dissolved: 1930

The Peace Society, International Peace Society or London Peace Society, originally known as the Society for the Promotion of Permanent and Universal Peace, was a British pacifist organisation that was active from 1816 until the 1930s.

== History ==
=== Foundation ===
The Society for the Promotion of Permanent and Universal Peace was founded after a meeting at the premises of William Allen, in Plough Court, Lombard Street in the City of London on 14 June 1816. Following the Battle of Waterloo the previous year and the decades of European conflict with Napoleon Bonaparte, it advocated a gradual, proportionate, and simultaneous disarmament of all nations and the principle of arbitration. Many of the founders came together under the banner of Christian abolitionism and a number were Quakers.

The society in London helped establish auxiliary societies in various cities and towns across the United Kingdom; for instance at Doncaster and Leeds, Swansea and Neath, Newcastle, Birmingham, Liverpool, Bath, Bristol, Coventry, Exeter, Darlington, Leicester, Hull, Plymouth and Southampton; to name but a few. It published a monthly journal, The Herald of Peace, which was first printed in 1819.

On 25 May 1836 the society held their twentieth anniversary meeting at the Exeter Hall on London's Strand.

Between 1817 and 1833 the society issued twelve tracts for its membership, which ran to multiple editions:

- I. Anon. (Noah Worcester), A Solemn Review of the Custom of War; Showing that War is the Effect of Popular Delusion, and Proposing a Remedy (1817)
- II. John Scott, War Inconsistent with the Doctrine and Example of Jesus Christ. In a Letter to a Friend (1817)
- III. Thomas Clarkson, An Essay on the Doctrines and Practice of the Early Christians, as they Relate to War. Addressed to Those who Profess to have Regard for the Christian Name (1817)
- IV. Erasmus, Extracts from the Writings of Erasmus on the Subject of War (1817)
- V. Evan Rees, Sketches of the Horrors of War, Chiefly Selected from Labaume's narrative of the Campaign in Russia in 1812 (1818)
- VI. David Bogue, On Universal Peace; Being Extracts from a Discourse Delivered in October 1813 (1819)
- VII. Jonathan Dymond, Observations on the Applicability of the Pacific Principles of the New Testament to the Conduct of States, and on the Limitation which Those Principles Impose on the Rights of Self-defence (1825)
- VIII. Anon. (Mary Roberts), An Examination of the Principles which are Considered to Support the Practice of War. By a Lady (1825)
- IX. Thomas Hancock, The Principles of Peace, Exemplified in the Conduct of the Society of Friends in Ireland, during the Rebellion of 1798. In three parts (1825)
- X. Anon. (Mary Roberts), Historical Illustrations of the Origin and Consequences of War (by the author of Tract VIII) (1831)
- XI. M. Necker, Reflections on the Calamities of War, and the Superior Policy of Peace. Translated from the French (1831)
- XII. Joseph John Gurney, An Essay on War, and on its Lawfulness under the Christian Dispensation (1833)

=== Later 19th century ===
In 1842, the Peace Society produced 4,000 additional copies of the book published earlier that year War and Peace: the Evils of the First with a Plan for Securing the Last by William Jay for the 1842 Conference of the Friends of Peace.

In 1843 the Society hosted the first International Peace Congress, attended by over 300 delegates.

Lewis Appleton organized the International Arbitration and Peace Association (IAPA) in 1880. Unlike the Peace Society the IAPA accepted defensive war, was not restricted to Christians and claimed to be international. It also allowed women on the executive committee.

In the spring of 1882, E. M. Southey, the main founder of the Ladies Peace Association, persuaded her group to disaffiliate from the Peace Society and join the IAPA. The Quaker Priscilla Hannah Peckover played a central role in organizing a new ladies auxiliary of the Peace Society that was launched on 12 July 1882. During the 1880s the Peace Society stagnated. Its Ladies' Peace Association was more dynamic, and claimed 9,217 members by the summer of 1885, of which 4,000 belonged to Peckover's Wisbech group.

=== Early 20th century ===
The society's failure to condemn the outbreak of the First World War in 1914 resulted in internal divisions and led to the resignation of its leader, Rev. William Evans Darby. His successor, Rev. Herbert Dunnico, led the society's unsuccessful campaign for peace negotiations.

In 1930 the Peace Society merged with the International Christian Peace Fellowship and was renamed the International Peace Society. At sometime thereafter, with the Second World War looming and growing public unease towards British government policies of appeasement, it became defunct.

== Members ==
=== Founder members ===
As listed in The Origins of War Prevention by Martin Ceadel, the founding dozen in 1816 were:

- William Allen (1770–1843) - Quaker, philanthropist, chemist
- John Clarkson (1764–1828) - Abolitionist, founding father of Sierra Leone, brother of Thomas Clarkson
- Thomas Clarkson (1760–1846) - Abolitionist and campaigner, brother of John Clarkson, author of the society's third tract
- William Crawford (1788–1847) - Philanthropist and prison reformer
- Charles Stokes Dudley (1780–1862) - Born to a Quaker family, active in the British and Foreign Bible Society
- Rev. Thomas Harper (1762–1832) - Clergyman based in Walworth, author of the society's ninth tract (see obit 1832, p. 528)
- Robert Marsden (1769/70–1847) - Evangelical, stockbroker, the society's first chairman
- Joseph Tregelles Price (1784–1854) - Quaker, family owned the Neath Abbey ironworks (see SAS)
- Evan Rees (1791–1821) - Welsh Quaker, businessman, author of the society's fifth tract (see SAS)
- John Scott (1757–1832) - Evangelical, banker, author of the society's second tract (which had originally been published in 1796)
- Frederick Smith (1757–1823) - Quaker, pharmacist and chemist
- Thomas Sturge the Elder (1749–1825) - Quaker, businessman and philanthropist

=== Other notable members and associates ===
- George William Alexander - Quaker, abolitionist and philanthropist
- Richard Dykes Alexander - Quaker, banker, friend of Thomas Clarkson
- Henry Andrews - Botanist and engraver
- Jonathan Backhouse Jr. - Quaker, banker and abolitionist
- Thomas Bell - Zoologist and dental surgeon
- Jeremy Bentham - Social reformer and philosopher
- Samuel Bowly - Quaker and abolitionist
- John Bowring - Jeremy Bentham's editor and Governor of Hong Kong
- John Bright - Quaker, politician
- Hugh Stowell Brown - Leader of the Liverpool auxiliary
- James Silk Buckingham - Journalist, traveller and author
- John Burnet - Pastor and abolitionist
- Elihu Burritt - American diplomat, lecturer and social activist
- Rev. John Campbell - Congregationalist minister
- Gino Capponi - Italian statesman and historian
- Robert Lucas Chance - Founder of Chance Brothers glassworks
- Robert Charleton - Quaker, pin-manufacturer, philanthropist
- Richard Cobden - Politician, campaigner for Free Trade
- James Cropper - Philanthropist and abolitionist
- William Dillwyn - Quaker and abolitionist
- Jonathan Dymond - Quaker and an ethical philosopher
- Benjamin Meggot Forster - Botanist, abolitionist and brother of T. F. Forster
- Josiah Forster - Quaker, teacher and abolitionist
- Thomas Furley Forster - Botanist and abolitionist
- William Forster - Quaker, abolitionist, brother of Josiah Forster
- Samuel Fox - Quaker, philanthropist, abolitionist
- Elizabeth Fry - Quaker, prison and social reformer
- James Gambier, 1st Baron Gambier - Senior naval officer, war veteran
- Charles Gilpin - Quaker, publisher, politician
- Joseph John Gurney - Quaker, banker and brother of Samuel Gurney
- Samuel Gurney - Quaker, banker, philanthropist and abolitionist
- Christopher Newman Hall - Nonconformist divine
- Elizabeth Hanbury - Quaker and philanthropist
- Rev. James Hargreaves - Clergyman
- Rev. John Webster Hawksley - Rector of Turvey, Knotting and Souldrop
- Margaret Emily Hodge - Educator, suffragist and pacifist
- John Horniman - Quaker, founder of Hornimans tea company
- Luke Howard - Quaker, later Plymouth Brethren, scientist
- Alfred Illingworth - Liberal politician
- Keshub Chunder Sen - Hindu philosopher and social reformer
- Sir Wilfrid Lawson - Radical politician
- Joseph Jackson Lister - Quaker and scientist
- Henry Pease - Liberal politician, younger brother of Joseph Pease (later a President of the Society)
- Joseph Pease - Uncle of Joseph Pease (later President of the Society)
- Richard Phillips - Quaker and chemist
- Jacob Post - Quaker and abolitionist
- Richard Rathbone - Merchant and abolitionist
- Theophilus Redwood - Pharmacist
- Thomas Richardson - Quaker, businessman and investor
- William Russell - Unitarian and merchant
- John Scoble - Abolitionist
- Rev. William Stephenson - Clergyman in Fobbing, West Thurrock
- Joseph Sturge - Quaker, abolitionist, founded the Birmingham auxiliary
- Thomas Sturge - Merchant, social reformer, son of Thomas Sturge the Elder
- George Thompson - Abolitionist and anti-slavery activist
- Rev. Robert Vaughan - Congregationalist minister
- John Warner - Bellfounder and metalworker

== Chairmen/Presidents ==
- Robert Marsden - Chairman, 1817–1836
- Dr. John Lee - Barrister and astronomer; Chairman, ?-1843
- Charles Hindley - Moravian, politician; President, 1843–1857
- Samuel Morley - Radical politician and philanthropist; President, 1858-1860?
- Joseph Pease - Quaker, politician; President, 1860–1872

== Secretaries ==
- Evan Rees - Secretary, ?–1821
- Rev. Nun Morgan Harry - Secretary, ?–1830
- Rev. John Jefferson - Congregational pastor; Secretary, 1840–1848
- Rev. Henry Richard - Congregational pastor and politician; Secretary, 1848–1885
- Rev. William Evans Darby - Secretary, 1885–1915
- Rev. Herbert Dunnico – Secretary, 1915–?

== Treasurers ==
- John Clarkson - Treasurer, 1816–1819
- John Scott - Treasurer, 1820–1831
- Samuel Gurney - Treasurer, 1832–?

== Records of the Peace Society ==
- International Peace Society Records, 1817–1948 at Swarthmore College, Pennsylvania. Note: this is a large file of pamphlets and other printed publications of the Society. There is an historical introduction to the collection but no business archives are in the collection.
- Other records of the Peace Society are reported to be in the possession of [Rev.] C. P. Dunnico

There are also records at the Savings Bank Museum, in Ruthwell, Dumfriesshire, Scotland, as the founder of the first parish savings bank Henry Duncan wrote on this subject.

== See also ==
- Christian pacifism
- Exeter Hall
- International Peace Congress
- List of anti-war organizations
- Peace congress
- World Anti-Slavery Convention
- American Peace Society, founded in 1828
- New York Peace Society, founded in 1815
- German Peace Society (German: Deutsche Friedensgesellschaft), founded in 1892
