= Thomas Hancock (physician) =

Irish physician

- Born: 1783; County Antrim
- Died: 6 April 1849 (aged 65–66)
- Occupation: Physician

Thomas Hancock (1783 – 6 April 1849) was an Irish medical doctor.

== Biography ==
Hancock was born in 1783 of Quaker parents in the south of County Antrim, was educated at Ackford, Yorkshire, was apprenticed to a surgeon at Waterford, and graduated M.D. at Edinburgh 26 June 1809. His thesis was 'De Morbis Epidemicis,' a subject in which he was interested throughout his life. He became a licentiate of the College of Physicians of London 26 June 1809, and began practice in London, living in Finsbury Square. He attained considerable practice, and was elected physician to the City and Finsbury dispensaries.

In 1810 he contributed some articles on lunatic asylums to the Belfast Monthly Magazine. In 1821 he published Researches into the Laws and Phenomena of Pestilence, including a medical sketch and review of the Plague of London in 1665 and Remarks on Quarantine. The book is an enlargement of an address delivered to the Medical Society of London in 1820, and contains much information on epidemics. In 1824 he published an Essay on Instinct and its Physical and Moral Relations, in which he criticises the flippant remarks of Lawrence the surgeon on the Creation, and states clearly the views on instinct which were general before the time of Darwin. His next book appeared in 1825, The Principles of Peace exemplified in the Conduct of the Society of Friends in Ireland during the Rebellion of the year 1798, and has the most lasting value of all his works. Of the many histories of that rebellion, this based entirely upon the statements of eye-witnesses gives the clearest view of the unsettled, varied, and ignorant notions of the great mass of the insurgents. It was reproduced as a tract by the London Peace Society. In 1832 he published The Laws and Progress of the Epidemic Cholera, having shortly before removed to Liverpool, where in 1835 his last work appeared, A Defence of the Doctrines of Immediate Revelation and Universal Saving Light, in reply to some remarks contained in a work entitled "A Beacon to the Society of Friends".

In 1838 he left Liverpool and settled in Lisburn, where he resided till his death, from heart disease, on 6 April 1849, aged 66. His works show him to have been a man of extensive reading and sound sense. He was an admirer of Locke, and prized very highly a beautiful little manuscript in Locke's handwriting which he possessed. He edited in 1828 Discourses, translated from Nicole's Essays by John Locke. Hancock published anonymously An elegy supposed to be written on a field of battle, 1818, and The Law of Mercy, a poetical essay on the punishment of death.
