= Williams Deacon's Bank =

UK business

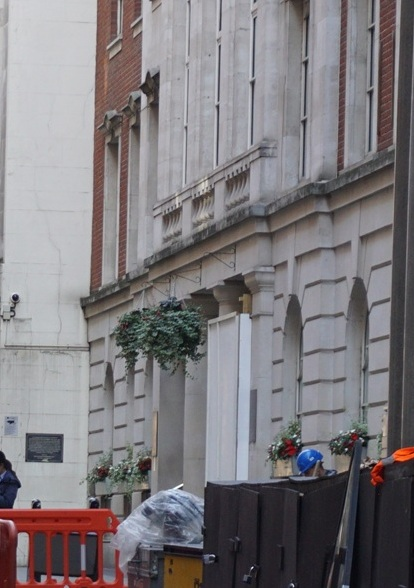
- Former head office at 20 Birchin Lane, London
- Industry: financial service activities, except insurance and pension funding
- Founded: 1771
- Defunct: 1930
- Fate: Acquired by the Royal Bank of Scotland
- Headquarters: London

Williams Deacon's Bank was acquired by the Royal Bank of Scotland in 1930. It had a large network of branches in the north-west of England. In 1970, it was integrated with Glyn, Mills & Co. and The National Bank (which were part of the same group) to form Williams & Glyn's Bank.

== History ==
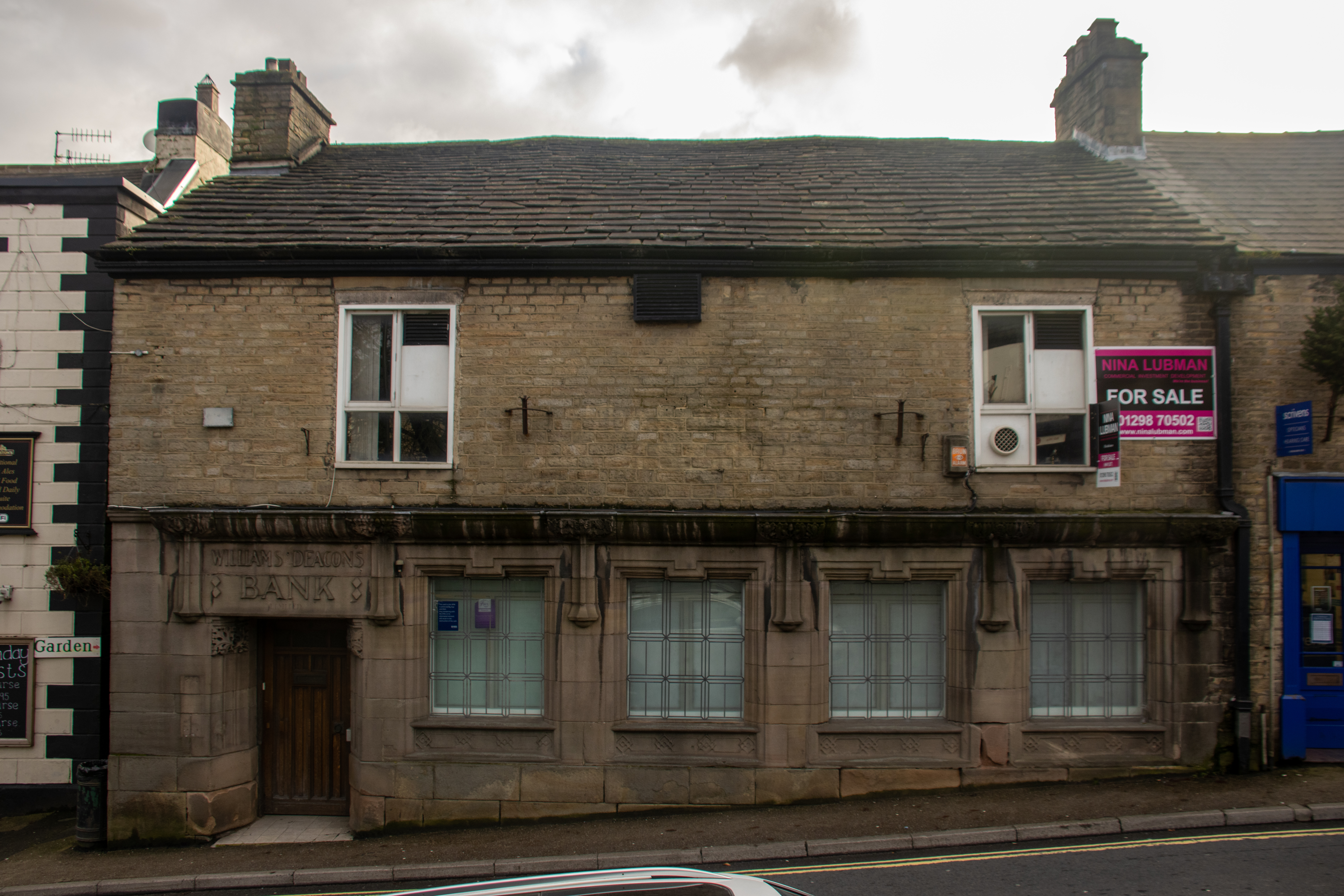
A Williams Deacon's Bank building in Chapel-en-le-Frith

Familiarity with the Williams Deacon's name conceals the reality that the dominant institution was the Manchester & Salford Bank. When Manchester & Salford acquired Williams Deacon's in 1890 it changed its name to the cumbersome Williams Deacon & Manchester & Salford Bank only to shorten it to Williams Deacon's Bank in 1901. The bank was acquired by the Royal Bank of Scotland in 1931.

=== Manchester & Salford Bank ===
The Manchester and Salford Banking Company was founded in 1836. Forty years later, Grindon wrote that of the older Manchester joint stock banks, "this one stands alone in never having brought on itself any serious misfortune ... and never slackened in steady and prosperous advance." Once the company was formed, the bank appointed Williams Deacon as its London agents, thus starting the relationship which was to result in the latter's acquisition.

Despite the Salford in its title, the bank confined itself to its sole Manchester office until 1862. Salford then became the first branch, followed by Southport and other south Lancashire towns. In 1874, the bank acquired the business of Heywood Brothers. Benjamin Heywood had left the Liverpool Heywood banking firm in 1778 to open a Manchester bank trading as Benjamin Heywood, Sons, later Heywood Brothers, and the family was one of the best known in the two cities. Local banks in Bolton and Rochdale were acquired soon after the Heywood purchase.

The pace of expansion increased rapidly after 1887. In that year the number of branches was no more than 20 but in the following two years another 26 were added. Even this was eclipsed in 1890 when the bank acquired the London firm of Williams Deacon. The registered office was moved to Williams Deacon's Birchin Lane office to ensure that the seat on the London Bankers' Clearing House was protected, but the bank's head office remained in Manchester.

=== Williams Deacon & Co. ===
The first mention of the bank in the London Directory was in 1771 as Raymond, Williams, Vere, Lowe and Fletcher, though Hilton Price implies that it pre-dated the entry. As partners changed, it had gone through as many as 14 different names by 1825, when it became Williams, Williams, Burgess & Williams. However, in that year the bank ceased payments following the collapse of Pole, Thornton and it was reconstituted with different shareholders as Williams, Deacon, Labouchere & Co, before finally becoming Williams Deacon in 1882.

=== Post-acquisition ===
In recognition of the importance of the London acquisition, the bank's name was changed to Williams Deacon and Manchester and Salford Bank, shortened to Williams Deacon's in 1901. The programme of branch openings continued and these particularly included ones in the London area. Acquisitions were discussed but none reached fruition until the Sheffield & Rotherham Joint Stock Banking Company in 1907. The Sheffield & Rotherham had been formed in 1792, backed by the Walker family iron and steel wealth – "one of the great pioneering families of the Industrial Revolution". The partnership, by then Messrs. Walkers and Stanley, was converted into a joint stock company in 1836. By the time of its acquisition, the Sheffield & Rotherham had its two main offices, six branches and four sub-branches, taking Williams Deacon's up to 102 offices in total.

The major part of the bank's business remained in Lancashire and the decline in the cotton trade after World War I posed particular problems for the bank. The cotton industry's reconstruction scheme crystallised bad debts and threatened a reduction in the dividend. The Bank of England arranged for talks between the bank and the Royal Bank of Scotland in 1929 and the following year Williams Deacon's was duly acquired by the Royal Bank.

== Williams Deacon partnership names ==
The following are the partnership names used by Williams Deacon:

- Raymond, Williams, Vere, Lowe & Fletcher 1771-8 founded by Charles Raymond, John Williams, Charles Vere, Robert Lowe and Henry Fletcher
- Lowe, Vere, Williams & Jennings 1778 founded by Robert Lowe, Charles Vere, Robert Williams and John Jennings
- Lowe, Vere & Williams 1778–1785 founded by Robert Lowe, Charles Vere and Robert Williams
- Vere & Williams 1785-8 founded by Charles Vere and Robert Williams
- Vere, Williams, Son, Wilkinson & Drury 1788-9
- Williams, Son, Wilkinson & Drury 1790-1
- Williams, Son & Drury 1792-9 founded by Robert Williams, Robert Williams II and John Drury
- Williams, Son, Drury & Moffat 1797–1807 founded by Robert Williams, Robert Williams II, John Drury and William Moffat
- Williams, Son, Drury, Moffat & Burgess 1808–09 founded by Robert Williams, Robert Williams II, John Drury, William Moffat and William Hugh Burgess
- Williams, Son, Moffat & Burgess 1810–11 founded by Robert Williams, Robert Williams II, William Moffat and William Hugh Burgess
- Williams, Son, Moffat, Burgess & Lane 1812–14 founded by Robert Williams, Robert Williams II, William Moffat, William Hugh Burgess and Thomas Lane
- Williams, Williams & Burgess c. 1815–22 founded by Robert Williams, Robert Williams II and William Hugh Burgess
- Williams, Williams, Burgess & Williams c. 1822-5 founded by Robert Williams, Robert Williams II, William Hugh Burgess and Charles Montague Williams
- Williams, Deacon, Labouchere & Co 1826-8 founded by Robert Williams, John Deacon and John Peter Labouchere
- Williams, Deacon, Labouchere, Thornton & Co 1828–63 founded by Robert Williams II, John Deacon, John Peter Labouchere and Henry Sykes Thornton
- Williams, Deacon, Thornton & Co 1863–82 founded by Robert Williams II, John Deacon and Henry Sykes Thornton
- Williams, Deacon & Co from 1882–90 founded by Robert Williams II and John Deacon
