= Marianne Thornton =

English abolitionist (1797–1887)

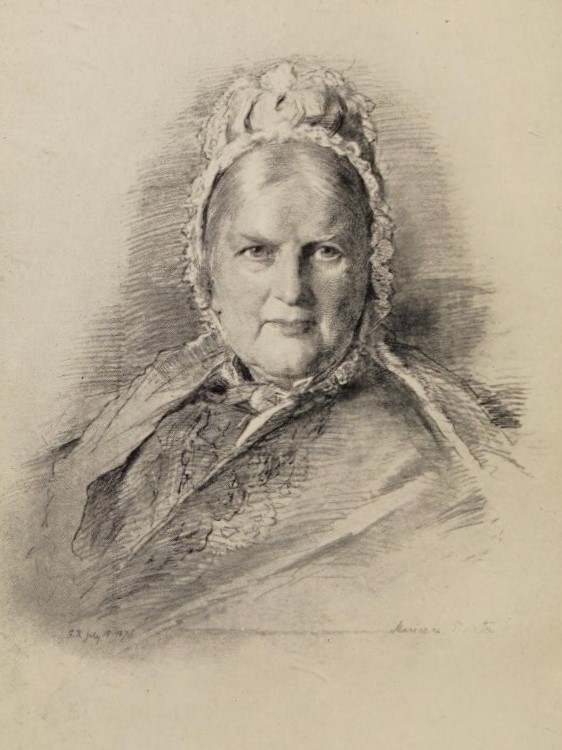
- Born: 10 March 1797
- Died: 5 November 1887 (aged 90)
- Occupation: Abolitionist
- Parent(s): Henry Thornton (father); Marianne Sykes (mother)
- Relatives: E. M. Forster (great-nephew)

Marianne Thornton (10 March 1797 – 5 November 1887) was an English abolitionist and bluestocking. A leading female figure of the Clapham Sect, she is known as a letter-writer, charity worker and family matriarch.

== Early life ==
Marianne Thornton was the eldest of nine children of the philanthropist, economist and abolitionist Henry Thornton (1760–1815) and his wife Marianne Sykes (1765–1815). She spent most of her life in Clapham. As a child she admired Charemile Grant, daughter of Charles Grant, before the family moved away.

Her father, MP for Southwark, was, with William Wilberforce and Grant, a member of the influential evangelical Clapham Sect; Marianne and her brother Henry Sykes Thornton were noted Third Generation members of the Sect. Marianne became her father's amanuensis at age 15.

=== Sykes background ===
Marianne Sykes (properly Mary Anne) and Henry Thornton had first met in Kingston upon Hull in 1782, when he was a candidate in a by-election there. The only daughter in a family of six, at the recommendation of Anna Seward she had been sent to school in Derby with Mrs Lattafière or Latuffière.

Marianne Sykes before marriage, portrait by John Hoppner

== After 1815 ==
After the death of both parents in 1815, Marianne and her siblings had as guardian Sir Robert Inglis. From 1816, Thornton travelled a number of times on the continent of Europe. The first trip was to Paris, in the company of her uncle Daniel Sykes and his wife Dorothy, her correspondent "Aunt Dan". The following years with the Inglises she visited the site of the Battle of Waterloo. In 1818 there was the first of several family journeys to Switzerland.

== Activism ==
The Clapham Saints, as they were called, shared views concerning slavery, and reform of the penal system, amongst other humanitarian issues. During the 1820s Thornton attended the May Meetings in London that centred on Exeter Hall. In 1824 at a meeting for the Anti-Slavery Society she heard Thomas Babington Macaulay speak at Freemasons' Hall on the case of John Smith of the London Missionary Society who had been caught up in the Demerara rebellion of 1823. She was accompanied by her brother Henry, a close friend of Macaulay from Cambridge. She reacted to the Apocrypha controversy of the 1820s, which disrupted the British and Foreign Bible Society to the dismay of William Wilberforce:

We all thought that the Bible Society was so simple in its form and its object that none of the frailties of mortality could touch it [...]

Of Thornton's activism, Moore wrote "The foundation of those societies which so excited Marianne Thornton and her friends" (for the abolitionist cause and others)

was significant of the change that had begun, channelling private and personal philanthropy into official and public charity, which at this stage which at this stage provided a less satisfactory outlet for the Christian woman worker, who was still perforce an amateur.

Thornton's mother had founded charity schools in her home community of West Ella. She herself, in Clapham, from a young age went into schools to speak to poor children and tried to assist. With her sisters, she ran early settlements.

== Milton Bryan(t) ==
Thornton inherited the manor of Milton Bryan (or Milton Bryant) in Bedfordshire; it passed to her with a life interest on the death in 1872 of Mary, widow of Sir Robert Inglis. She resided at the Manor House there, in the summer months, and in Clapham.

Her interest in the house passed to Henrietta Louisa Synnot, daughter of her sister Henrietta Thornton and her husband Richard Walter Synnot, son of Sir Walter Synnot. On 21 August 1893 Anne Thackeray Ritchie visited the Manor House at Milton Bryant, where Synnot was by then the Lady, to see Synnot's friend Caroline Stephen; she noted in her journal that Synnot was "kind".

== Family ==
The Library, Battersea Rise House, sketch c.1820

From 1833, marriages of brothers and sisters began to reduce the family circle at Battersea Rise; but when the American Episcopal bishop George Washington Doane visited the house in 1841, he was loud in its praise, and wrote a commemorative poem. Marianne's nephew "Doanie" born that year was James William Doane Forster (died 1857).

After a family break with her brother Henry over his marriage with a deceased wife's sister, Emily Dealtry ("Di"), daughter of William Dealtry, Marianne Thornton in 1852 moved out from Battersea Rise. She settled nearby at 1, The Sweep, Clapham, known as "East Side"; and was able to communicate with Battersea Rise through the Clapham surgeon Edward Tayloe [sic]. At the end of her life, she endeavoured to reconcile with Henry's widow, who was living at Battersea Rise.

Thornton never married. Henry Venn (1796–1873), another of the Clapham Sect Third Generation, considered her as a possible second wife, after the death in 1840 of his wife Martha née Sykes, Marianne's first cousin.. Nothing came of this potential match, for religious reasons, as Henry's son John Venn wrote in 1918 to Marianne's niece Louisa Forster: Marianne's style of evangelicalism didn't measure up. From the time of her brother-in-law Richard Walter Synnot's death in 1841, Marianne was involved in the guardianship of his two children with her sister Henrietta (died 1853), Robert Harry Inglis (1837–1872) and Henrietta Louisa. Her niece Frances Marian(ne) Thornton (born 1863/4), who married Reginald Southey in 1864 and died in 1912 aged 68, was the daughter of the Rev. Watson Joseph Thornton who died in 1855. Orphaned, she "frequented Clapham" until her marriage. The 1861 Census shows Robert and Henrietta Synnott and Frances Thornton resident with Marianne Thornton.

Marianne Thornton was the paternal great-aunt of the novelist E. M. Forster, to whom she bequeathed the sum of £8,000 as a legacy in trust. Forster published a social biography of her and the Thornton family in 1956. His mother Alice Clara Whichelo (Lily) was introduced to the Thornton family by Mr. Tayloe. Through the family, she became a governess in the family of Thomas Henry Farrer, whose second wife was a daughter of Fanny and Hensleigh Wedgwood (see below).

== Correspondence and associations ==
Thornton's correspondents included her godmother, Hannah More, mostly in the period 1814 to 1826. Her letters to More about the May Meetings have been called "wickedly funny and gossipy reports". She corresponded also with Sally, daughter of Sarah Wesley the widow of Charles Wesley, about money matters; her father had supported Sarah Wesley after Charles's death. Thornton wrote in 1827 to More about an encounter at Milton Bryant with Frances Mackintosh (Fanny), daughter of James Mackintosh, who was staying at Ampthill Park; she later married Hensleigh Wedgwood. They became long-term friends.

Martha Frances Smith (1782–1870) known as Patty, eldest daughter of the abolitionist William Smith, was a close friend of Thornton from around 1815. Their extensive correspondence lasting until Smith's death, mentioned in Nightingales by Gillian Gill, does not survive, though Forster's Marianne Thornton gives extracts. Thornton confided to Patty Smith in 1835 her reasons for refusing to hand over More's letters to the Thornton family to her official biographer, William Roberts.

Through her schools work, Thornton was involved with the Rev. Alexander Ronald Grant, son of Patrick Grant, whose maternal grandfather was Charles Grant of Clapham. For Alexander Strahan, a series of small "Reading Books" books was produced with Grant as editor. These were to assist elementary schools with compliance with the 1892 requiring inspections. E. M. Forster attributed robustly humorous dialogues in them to Thornton, as her only published writing.

After Jane Senior's death in 1877, Thornton supported the Association to honour her memory set up by her son Walter Senior, with James Stansfeld as President. Other supporters included Olivia Hill and Florence Nightingale. Nightingale wrote to her sister-in-law Margaret Verney explaining her reluctance to give her name without participating, but her feeling that she could not refuse "Miss Thornton". The initial Committee of the "Association for boarding-out orphans" consisted of Stansfeld and Hill with Thomas Hughes (father of Jane Senior) and William Shaen; Miss Synnot (Thornton's niece Henrietta Louisa) was one of two secretaries, the other being Caroline Stephen.

Thornton was a friend of Charles Kegan Paul. In his memoirs, he recalls how she passed on to him a spoof examination paper on the novel Emma, concocted by the Rev. Edward Joseph Rose, vicar of Weybridge.

== Legacy ==
Thornton left in manuscript "Recollections", a memoir begun at age 60. She returned to the work in 1876, prompted by George Otto Trevelyan's biography of Lord Macaulay, when young a family friend. E. M. Forster cites as sources for his biography a complex collection of family papers, starting with the "First Vellum Book" in which there are 434 pages by Thornton, followed by a transcription of the "Recollections" and other materials added by Laura Forster.

In Papers in English Monetary History (1953), letters Thornton wrote at the time of the Panic of 1825, concerning the affairs of the family bank Pole, Thornton, Free, Down & Scott which failed, formed Chapter 7. A review by Karl H. Niebyl commented "these letters, their disarming naïveté and in a Jane Austen manner charming superficiality may well point up what I will call the underlying thesis and what is at the same time the moral of this pointed collection of papers in book form." The letters, addressed to Hannah More, had earlier appeared in The Three Banks Review.

The Marianne Thornton School in Clapham, a secondary school for girls, existed from 1960 to 1997. After a merger in 1976, it was named Walsingham School.
