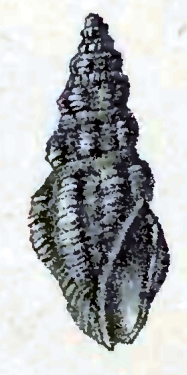
- Drawing of a shell of Crassispira consociata

Scientific classification
- Kingdom: Animalia
- Phylum: Mollusca
- Class: Gastropoda
- Subclass: Caenogastropoda
- Order: Neogastropoda
- Superfamily: Conoidea
- Family: Pseudomelatomidae
- Genus: Crassispira
- Species: C. consociata

Binomial name
- Crassispira consociata (E.A. Smith, 1877)

Synonyms
- Drillia consociata Smith E.A., 1877; Pleurotoma consociata Smith E. A., 1877

= Crassispira consociata =

Species of gastropod

Crassispira consociata is a species of sea snail, a marine gastropod mollusk in the family Pseudomelatomidae.

== Description ==
The length of the shell attains 24 mm. The yellowish brown whorls are doubly carinated at the suture, below which the surface is concave to the periphery. The six longitudinal ribs are strong and crossed by raised revolving lines; yellowish brown.

== Distribution ==
This marine species occurs off Senegal and Angola.
