= Ludwig Heinrich von Jakob =

German philosopher, political scientist and economist (1759–1827)

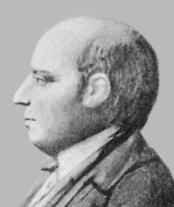
Ludwig Heinrich von Jakob.

Ludwig Heinrich von Jakob (26 February 1759 – 22 July 1827) was a German philosopher, political scientist and economist. During the French occupation of Germany, he worked as a consultant and professor in Russia.

== Biography ==
He was born at Wettin, Duchy of Magdeburg; in 1777 he entered the University of Halle. In 1780 he was appointed teacher at the gymnasium, and in 1791 professor of philosophy at the university. He was very popular as a lecturer on metaphysics, but after 1800 turned his attention especially to political economy.

The suppression of the University of Halle having been decreed by Napoleon, Jakob left for the Russian Empire, where in 1807 he was appointed professor of political economy at Kharkoff University (now in Ukraine). In 1809, he was appointed a member of the government commission to inquire into the finances of Russia. He distinguished himself in this inquiry and received various tokens of regard from Alexander I. In 1810, he became president of the commission for the revision of criminal law, and at the same time he obtained an important office in the finance department, with the rank of counsellor of state.

In 1816, he returned to Halle to occupy the chair of political economy. He died at Lauchstädt.

== Works ==
Shortly after his first appointment to a professorship in Halle, Jakob had begun to turn his attention rather to the practical than the speculative side of philosophy, and in 1805 he published at Halle Lehrbuch der Nationalökonomie, in which he was the first to advocate in Germany the necessity of a distinct science dealing specially with the subject of national wealth. His principal works are:

- Hume, David (1790). David Hume über die menschliche Natur, aus dem Englischen, nebst kritischen Versuchen zur Beurteilung dieses Werks von Ludwig Heinrich Jakob. Erster Band: Ueber den menschlichen Verstand. Vol. 1. Translated by Ludwig Heinrich Jakob. Halle: Hemmerde und Schwetschke.
- Hume, David (1791). David Hume über die menschliche Natur, aus dem Englischen, nebst kritischen Versuchen zur Beurteilung dieses Werks von Ludwig Heinrich Jakob. Zweiter Band: Ueber die Leidenschaften. Translated by Ludwig Heinrich Jakob. Halle: Hemmerde und Schwetschke.
- Hume, David (1792). David Hume über die menschliche Natur, aus dem Englischen, nebst kritischen Versuchen zur Beurteilung dieses Werks von Ludwig Heinrich Jakob. Dritter Band: Ueber die Moral. Vol. 3. Translated by Ludwig Heinrich Jakob. Halle: Hemmerde und Schwetschke.
- Grundriss der allgemeinen Logik und kritische Anfangsgründe der allgemeinen Metaphysik ("Outline of basic logic," Halle, 1788; 3rd ed., Frankfurt, 1794; 4th ed., 1800)
- Thornton, Heinrich (1803). Der Papier-Credit von Großbritannien. Translated by Ludwig Heinrich von Jacob. Halle: in der Ruffsche Verlagsbuchhandlung – via Internet Archive.
- Grundsätze der Polizeigesetzgebung und Polizeianstalten ("Foundations of the making of police laws and police forces," Leipzig, 1809)
- Grundriss der Erfahrungsseelenlehre (4th ed., 1810)
- Einleitung in des Studium der Staatswissenschaften ("Introduction to the study of political science," Halle, 1819)
- Entwurf eines Criminalgesetzbuchs für das russische Reich ("Proposal for criminal law statutes for the Russian Empire," Halle, 1818)
- Staatsfinanzwissenschaft ("Public finance," 2 vols., Halle, 1821).
- Die Staats Wissenchaft, theoretisch und praktisch dargestellt, &c (1821).
- Lehrbuch der Nationalökonomie ("Primer of political economy," Halle, 1805; 3rd ed., 1825)

== Literature ==
- Vladimir Abashnik, Ludwig Heinrich von Jakob. In: The Dictionary of eighteenth-century German philosophers. General editors: Heiner F. Klemme, Manfred Kuehn. In 3 vol. London: Continuum International Publishing Group Ltd., 2010, Vol. 2: H – P, pp. 590–594.
- Ripley, George; Dana, Charles A., eds. (1879). "Jakob, Ludwig Heinrich von" . The American Cyclopædia.
