= Henry Thornton (reformer) =

English economist, banker, philanthropist and parliamentarian (1760–1815)

The Right Honourable Henry Thornton

Member of Parliament for Southwark
- In office 1782–1815

Personal details
- Born: 10 March 1760 Clapham, England
- Died: 16 January 1815 (aged 54) Kensington Gore, London
- Resting place: St Paul's Church, Clapham
- Party: Independent
- Spouse: Marianne Sykes (m. 1796–1815)
- Children: 9, including Marianne Thornton
- Parent(s): John Thornton (father); Lucy Watson (mother)
- Relatives: Samuel Thornton (brother); Robert Thornton (brother); William Wilberforce (cousin)
- Occupation: Banker; Member of Parliament; Philanthropist; Abolitionist
- Employer(s): Down, Thornton and Free

Academic work
- Discipline: Monetary economics
- Notable works: An Enquiry into the Nature and Effects of the Paper Credit of Great Britain (1802)

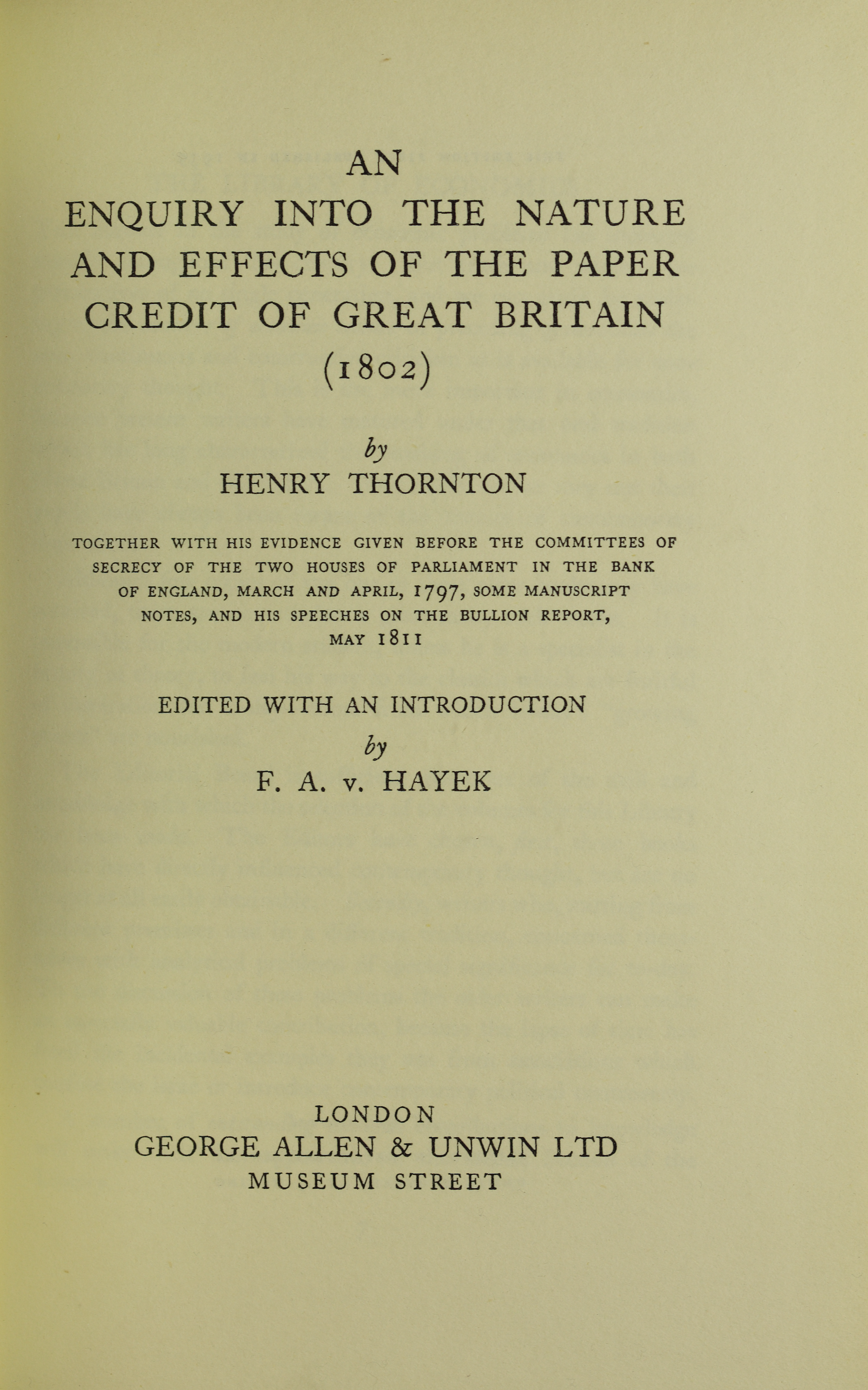
An Enquiry into the Nature and Effects of the Paper Credit of Great Britain (1939)

Henry Thornton (10 March 1760 – 16 January 1815) was an English economist, banker, philanthropist and parliamentarian.

== Early life ==
He was the son of John Thornton (1720–1790) of Clapham, London, who had been one of the early patrons of the evangelical movement in Britain. At the age of five, Henry attended the school of Mr Davis at Wandsworth Common, and later with Mr Roberts at Point Pleasant, Wandsworth. From 1778 he was employed in the counting house of his cousin Godfrey Thornton, two years later joining his father's company, where he later became a partner.

== Career ==
In 1784 Thornton joined the banking firm of Down and Free of London, later becoming a partner of the company which became known as Down, Thornton and Free. It was under his direction that this became one of the largest banking firms in London, with regional offices in other British cities.

In 1782 Henry Thornton had been urged to seek a seat in Parliament, and applied to contest one of the two seats for Hull. He soon withdrew on a point of principle, after learning that it was local custom to pay each voter two guineas in order to secure their vote. In September the same year Thornton was elected as member for Southwark, London. Despite lacking popular appeal, and refusing to bribe voters in a similar way to those of Hull, he became respected as a man of morals and integrity.

As an independent MP, Thornton sided with the Pittites, and in 1783 voted for peace with America. In general he tended to support William Pitt, Henry Addington and the Whig administration of William Grenville and Charles Fox. He seldom spoke in the House of Commons, as much of his contribution was in the various parliamentary committees on which he sat. In 1795 he became the treasurer of the committee responsible for the publication of the Cheap Repository Tracts.

He served on committees to examine the public debt (1798), the Irish exchange (1804), public expenditure (1807) and the bullion committee (1810), which scrutinised the high price of gold, foreign exchange, and the state of the British currency. The report of the committee, written by Thornton, argued for the resumption of gold payments in exchange for notes and deposits, which the Bank of England (of which his elder brother, Samuel Thornton, was a director) had suspended in 1797, but the recommendation was not well received at the time, and gold redemption on demand was not restored until 1821. In the next few years he continued to press for these measures to be implemented, publishing two reports in 1811.

This period 1797–1810 was a time of major change and great confusion in the British banking system, and the currency crisis of 1797 led to Thornton's greatest contribution as an economist, for which he is most remembered today. In 1802 he wrote An Enquiry into the Nature and Effects of the Paper Credit of Great Britain, in which he set out to correct the view that the increase in paper credit was the principal cause of the economic ills of the day. This was a work of great importance, and gave a detailed account of the British monetary system as well as a detailed examination of the ways in which the Bank of England should act to counteract fluctuations in the value of the pound.

== Abolitionist and reformer ==
Thornton was one of the founders of the Clapham Sect of evangelical reformers and a foremost campaigner for the abolition of the slave trade. A close friend and cousin of William Wilberforce, he is credited with being the financial brain behind their many campaigns for social reform and philanthropic causes which the group supported. For some years Thornton and Wilberforce shared a house called Battersea Rise which Thornton had bought in 1792. The cousins spent much time here co-coordinating their activities and entertaining their friends. After their marriages in 1796–97 they continued to live and work in close proximity for another decade.

In 1791 Thornton played a major part in the establishment of the Sierra Leone Company, which took over the failed attempt by Granville Sharp to create a colony for the settlement of freed slaves in Africa. The company sponsored the voyage to London (1791–93) of the Temne prince John Naimbanna.

As the company's foremost director, Thornton virtually administered the colony as chairman of the company until responsibility was transferred to the Crown in 1808. It was at this time that he became a friend of Zachary Macaulay, who was governor of the colony 1794–99.

In 1802 Thornton was one of the founders of the Christian Observer, the Clapham Sect's journal edited by Zachary Macaulay, to which he contributed many articles. He was also involved in supporting the spread of Christian missionary work, including the founding of the Society for Missions to Africa and the East (later the Church Missionary Society) in 1799, and the British and Foreign Bible Society (now the Bible Society) in 1804, of which he became the first treasurer. A friend of Hannah More, he assisted in the writing and publication of her Cheap Repository tracts. In 1806, Thornton served as Manager of the newly formed London Institution.

He was a pioneer of deaf education, setting up, with Rev John Townsend and Henry Cox Mason, rector of Bermondsey, Britain's first free school for deaf pupils, the London Asylum for the Deaf and Dumb. Its name and location changed over the centuries; The Royal School for Deaf Children Margate closed in 2015.

== Works ==
A successful merchant banker, as a monetary theorist Thornton has been described as the father of the modern central bank. An opponent of the real bills doctrine, he was a defender of the bullionist position and a significant figure in monetary theory, his process of monetary expansion anticipating Knut Wicksell's theory of the Cumulative process. His work on 19th century monetary theory has won praise from present-day economists for his forward-thinking ideas, including Friedrich Hayek, who wrote an introduction to his An Enquiry into the Nature and Effects of the Paper Credit of Great Britain, and John Maynard Keynes alike.

=== Economics ===
- An Enquiry into the Nature and Effects of the Paper Credit of Great Britain. London: J. Hatchard and Messr s. F. and C. Rivington. 1802 – via Internet Archive.
- Thornton, Henri (1803). Recherches sur la nature et les effets du crédit du papier dans la Grande Bretagne. Genéve: la Bibliothéque Britannique – via Google Books.
- Thornton, Heinrich (1803). Der Papier-Credit von Großbritannien. Translated by Ludwig Heinrich von Jacob. Halle: in der Ruffsche Verlagsbuchhandlung – via Internet Archive.
- Substance of two speeches of Henry Thornton, Esq.: in the debate in the House of Commons, on the report of the Bullion Committee, on the 7th and 14th of May, 1811. London: Printed for J. Hatchard. 1811 – via Internet Archive.
- Hayek, F.A. v., ed. (1939). An Enquiry into the Nature and Effects of the Paper Credit of Great Britain (1802), together with his evidence given before the Committee of Secrecy of the two Houses of Parliament in the Bank of England, March and April 1797, some manuscript notes, and his speeches on the Bullion Report, May 1811. London: George Allen & Unwin – via Internet Archive.
- Thornton, Henry (1807). An Inquiry Into the Nature and Effects of the Paper Credit of Great Britain. Philadelphia: James Humphreys.

=== Religious ===
- Family Commentary upon the Sermon on the Mount. London: Hatchard & Son. 1835 – via Google Books.
- Family prayers and prayers on the Ten Commandments: to which is added a family commentary upon the sermon on the mount. New York: Stanford and Swords. 1848 – via Internet Archive.
- Family Commentary on portions of the Pentateuch, in lectures, with prayers adapted to the subject. London: Hatchard & Son. 1837 – via Google Books.
- Family Prayers (5th ed.). London: Hatchard & Son. 1837 – via Internet Archive.
- Female Characters. London: Hatchard & Son. 1846 – via Google Books.

== Personal life and family ==
In 1796 Thornton married Marianne Sykes (1765–1815), daughter of Joseph Sykes, a merchant from Hull. They had nine children, three sons and six daughters. Henry Thornton was buried at St Paul's Church, Clapham where a commemorative plaque records the fact, with an additional reference to the family vault nearby. A selection of photographs is displayed on the website of the former school named after him.

Both parents died in 1815, and a family friend, Sir Robert Inglis, became guardian of the children. Of the children:

- The eldest child, Marianne Thornton, was a bluestocking who lived in Clapham for most of her long life. She was the subject of a biography by her great-nephew, E.M. Forster (1879–1970) the novelist.
- The eldest son, Henry Sykes Thornton (1800–1881), succeeded his father in the banking business, but the firm was merged into Williams Deacon's Bank following the financial crisis of 1825–6.
- Isabella, third daughter, in 1841 married the clergyman Benjamin Harrison. They had no children.
- Sophia (died 1887), the fourth daughter, married in 1834 as his second wife John Leslie-Melville, 9th Earl of Leven, and was mother of Ronald Leslie-Melville, 11th Earl of Leven.

== In media ==
- Amazing Grace, a film about William Wilberforce, Henry Thornton and the struggle against the slave trade, was released in 2007.

== See also ==
- Bank Restriction Act 1797
- Monetary policy
- Sierra Leone Company
- Clapham Sect
- Walter Bagehot

== Notes ==
Parliament of Great Britain
Preceded by Nathaniel Polhill; Sir Richard Hotham	Member of Parliament for Southwark; 1782 – 1800; With: Sir Richard Hotham to 1784; Sir Barnard Turner 1784; Paul Le Mesurier 1784–1796; George Woodford Thellusson 1796; George Tierney from 1796	Succeeded by Parliament of the United Kingdom
Parliament of the United Kingdom
Preceded by Parliament of Great Britain	Member of Parliament for Southwark; 1801 – 1815; With: George Tierney to 1806; Sir Thomas Turton, Bt 1806–1812; Charles Calvert from 1812	Succeeded by Charles Barclay; Charles Calvert
