= Ernest Ruthven Sykes =

British malacologist

Ernest Ruthven Sykes (1867–1954) was a British barrister and malacologist.

== Life ==
He was born at Weymouth, Dorset, the younger son of Major Cam Sykes of the 48th Regiment and his wife Emily Thornton, daughter of Henry Sykes Thornton. He was educated at Eton College and matriculated at Trinity College, Cambridge in 1886, graduating B.A. in 1889. He was called to the bar at the Inner Temple in 1891, and went the Western Circuit.

He published 99 malacological articles.

== Family ==
Sykes married in 1907 Gladys Bertha Melvill, second daughter of his malacological colleague James Cosmo Melvill.
