= Rendlesham (disambiguation) =

Rendlesham is a village and civil parish near Woodbridge, Suffolk, United Kingdom.

Rendlesham may also refer to:

- Baron Rendlesham, a title in the Peerage of Ireland

- Peter Thellusson, 1st Baron Rendlesham (1761–1808), British merchant, banker and politician
- Frederick Thellusson, 4th Baron Rendlesham (1798–1852), British politician
- Frederick Thellusson, 5th Baron Rendlesham (1840–1911), British politician

- Clare Rendlesham (died 1987), British fashion editor and boutique manager
- HMS Rendlesham, a Ham-class minesweeper of the Royal Navy
- Rendlesham Forest, a mixed woodland in Suffolk near Rendlesham

- The Rendlesham Forest incident, a series of reported sightings of unexplained lights and the alleged landing of a craft or multiple craft in Rendlesham Forest

- Rendlesham Hall, a manor house in Rendlesham
- Rendlesham Hurdle, a British National Hunt hurdle race

== See also ==
- Rendelsham, South Australia, a town
