= Isaac de Thellusson =

Genevan diplomat and banker

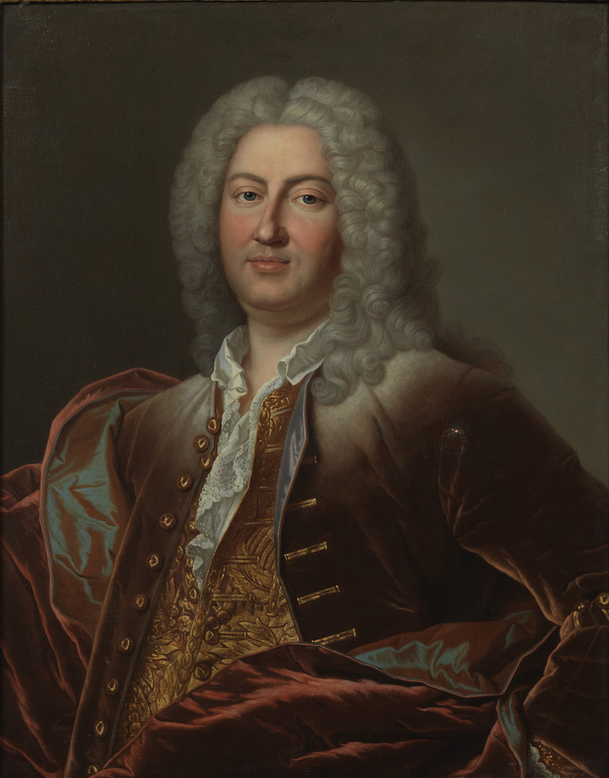
- Portrait by Hyacinthe Rigaud, c. 1722

Minister of Geneva in Paris
- In office 1730–1744

Personal details
- Born: 14 October 1690 Geneva, Republic of Geneva
- Died: 2 September 1755 (aged 64) Champel, Geneva, Republic of Geneva
- Spouse: Sarah Le Boullenger
- Relations: Peter Isaac Thellusson, 1st Baron Rendlesham (grandson); George Woodford Thellusson (grandson)
- Children: Peter Thellusson
- Parent(s): Theophile Thellusson; Jeanne Guigue

Isaac de Thellusson (14 October 1690 – 2 September 1755) was a Genevan diplomat and banker.

== Early life ==
Thellusson was born on 14 October 1690 in Geneva, Republic of Geneva, into a Huguenot family which had fled France for Geneva in the 16th century. He was the son of Théophile Thellusson, a merchant in Lyon, and Jeanne Guiguer (sister to Louis Guiguer, who built Prangins Castle). Thellusson was a great-grandson of the theologian Theodore Tronchin.

== Career ==
When his father died in 1705, Thellusson had already been away from Geneva a year to gain experience in commerce. He first stayed in Basel, then in Amsterdam, before settling in London with his uncle Isaac Guiguer who was an associate of Nicolas Tourton, where he learned languages and banking.

Thellusson moved to Paris in 1707 and began working for the Tourton et Guiguer bank, which had been founded c. 1703 by his uncle Louis Guiguer with Jean-Claude Tourton. He became first clerk before taking over management of the bank in November 1715. His uncle Louis Guiguer, who had remained a sponsor, withdrew completely in 1717 and the bank was renamed Thellusson et Cie bank. Despite his relative youth, Thellusson became a very prominent banker and in his practices, was opposed to the Law system, designed by the financier John Law. The partnership between Thellusson and Jean-Claude Tourton came to an end in 1722 and the bank continued under the name Tourton et Burrish, named after the first clerk. When Jean-Claude Tourton died two years later on 26 July 1724, he had designated Thellusson as his universal legatee, not his Guiguer nephews. In no small party due to the fact that Thellusson was a Genevan Huguenot, the two Catholic Guiguer nephews successfully attacked the will.

Therefore, Thellusson decided to create a new company in 1728, joining forces with François Tronchin to found the François Tronchin et Cie bank. The two partners, of very different generations and characters, did not get along well and, in October 1740, the company was dissolved their business feud was finally eventually arbitrated by the Small Council of Geneva in 1748.

=== Political career ===
Thellusson began his political career in 1728 when he was elected to the Council of Two Hundred of Geneva, despite having spent little time there since his childhood. Also in 1728, he acquired Tronchin House, adjacent to the Town Hall (Hôtel de Ville) of Geneva, from François Tronchin, (Note: François Tronchin (1704–1798), a lawyer, banker and art collector, was a friend of Voltaire (who lived in Geneva at Les Délices, the property of Tronchin's brother, Jean Robert Tronchin.) after Tronchin was ruined in the Mississippi Company affair. In 1730 he became the ambassador of the Republic of Geneva to the King of France in Paris. In 1733 he was elected to the Council of Sixty.

From Paris, Thellusson played an important political role, particularly during the Geneva riots between 1734 and 1738. He then represented the most conservative tendency, the "Negatives", facing the demands of the bourgeoisie who demanded the right of représentants (representatives led by watchmaker Jacques François Deluc), the regular convening of the General Council and control of public management led by Micheli du Crest. He returned to settle in Geneva at Tronchin House in 1744.

=== Ennoblement ===
On 8 June 1737, King Frederick William I of Prussia ennobled Thellusson and his wife. The ennoblement was recognized in France, by letters patent given at Versailles, in July 1782.

The English branch of his male descendants, the only one surviving in the 21st century, has held the title of Baron Rendlesham in the Peerage of Ireland since 1806.

== Personal life ==
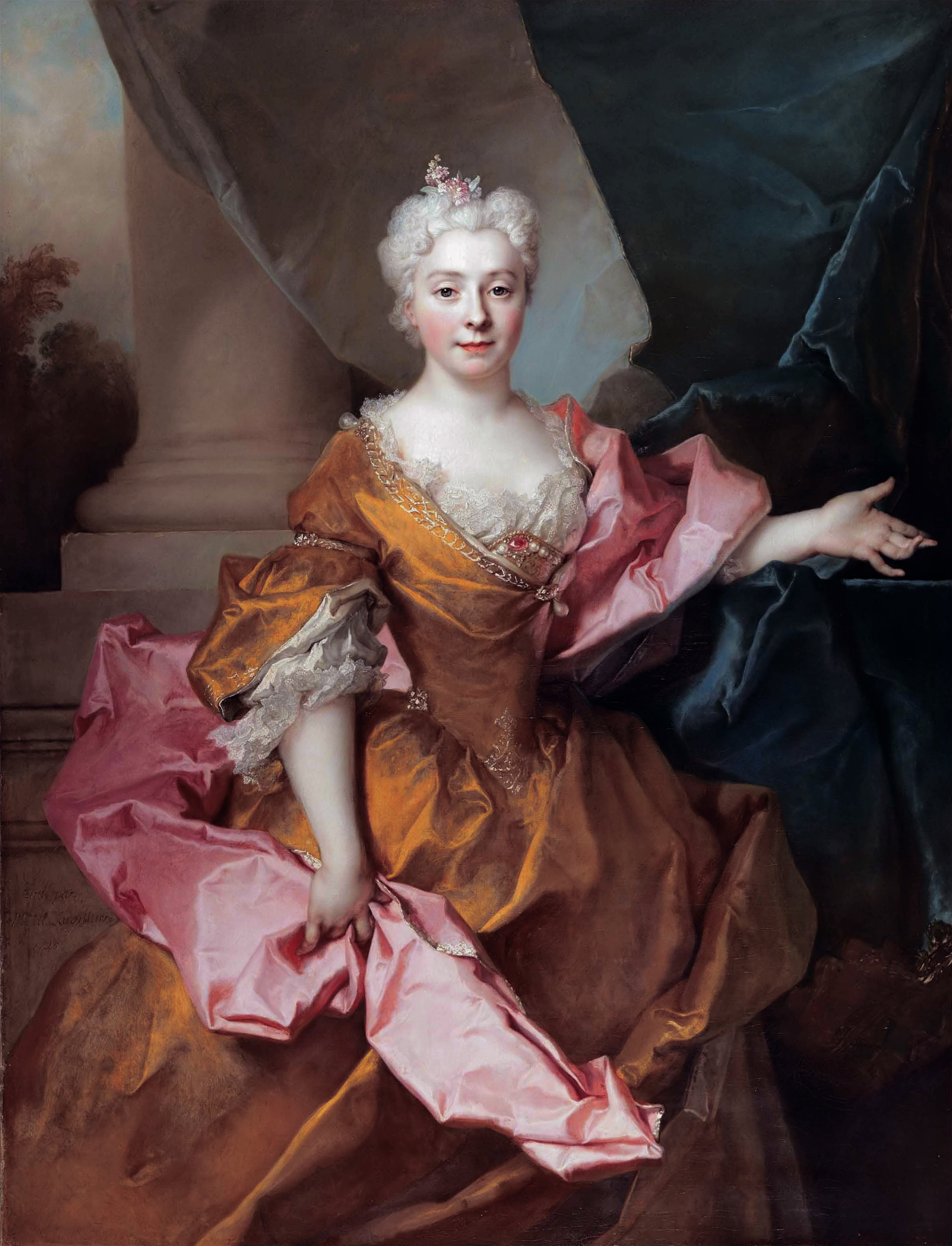
Portrait of his wife, Sarah le Boullenger, by Nicolas de Largillière, 1725

On 27 September 1722, Thellusson was married to Sarah Le Boullenger (1700–1770) in Leiden. She was a daughter of Abraham le Boullenger, Lord of Rixdorp, a Huguenot merchant who had emigrated from Rouen in 1685, and Anne van der Hulst, who was Dutch. Together, they were the parents of:

- Anne Sarah de Thellusson (1724–1749), who married London merchant Pierre Naville in 1745.
- Jeanne de Thellusson (1725–1802), who married Lt.-Gen. Jacques Pictet, Count Pictet, an envoy of the English court in Geneva, in 1745.
- Isaac Louis de Thellusson (1727–1801), a trustee of Geneva from 1785 to 1789; he married Henriette Bertrand in 1754. After her death, he married Julie Ployard in 1760.
- Georges-Tobie de Thellusson (1728–1776), who continued his banking activity in France, notably with Jacques Necker (the future Chief Minister of Louis XVI) under the name as Thellusson, Necker et Cie; he married Marie Jeanne Girardot de Vermenoux in 1757.
- Judith de Thellusson (1730–1750), who married Bernard de Diesbach, member of the Grand Council of Vaud and Treasurer of Vaud, in 1749.
- Elisabeth de Thellusson (1731–1798), who married Marc-Conrad Fabri, Baron de Ayre la Ville, in 1750.
- Pierre "Peter" de Thellusson (1735–1797), a merchant who settled in London in 1760 and purchased Brodsworth Hall in 1790; he married Ann Woodford (1740–1805), whose posterity in 1761.

Thellusson died on 2 September 1755 at his property in Champel, in the Republic of Geneva.

=== Descendants ===
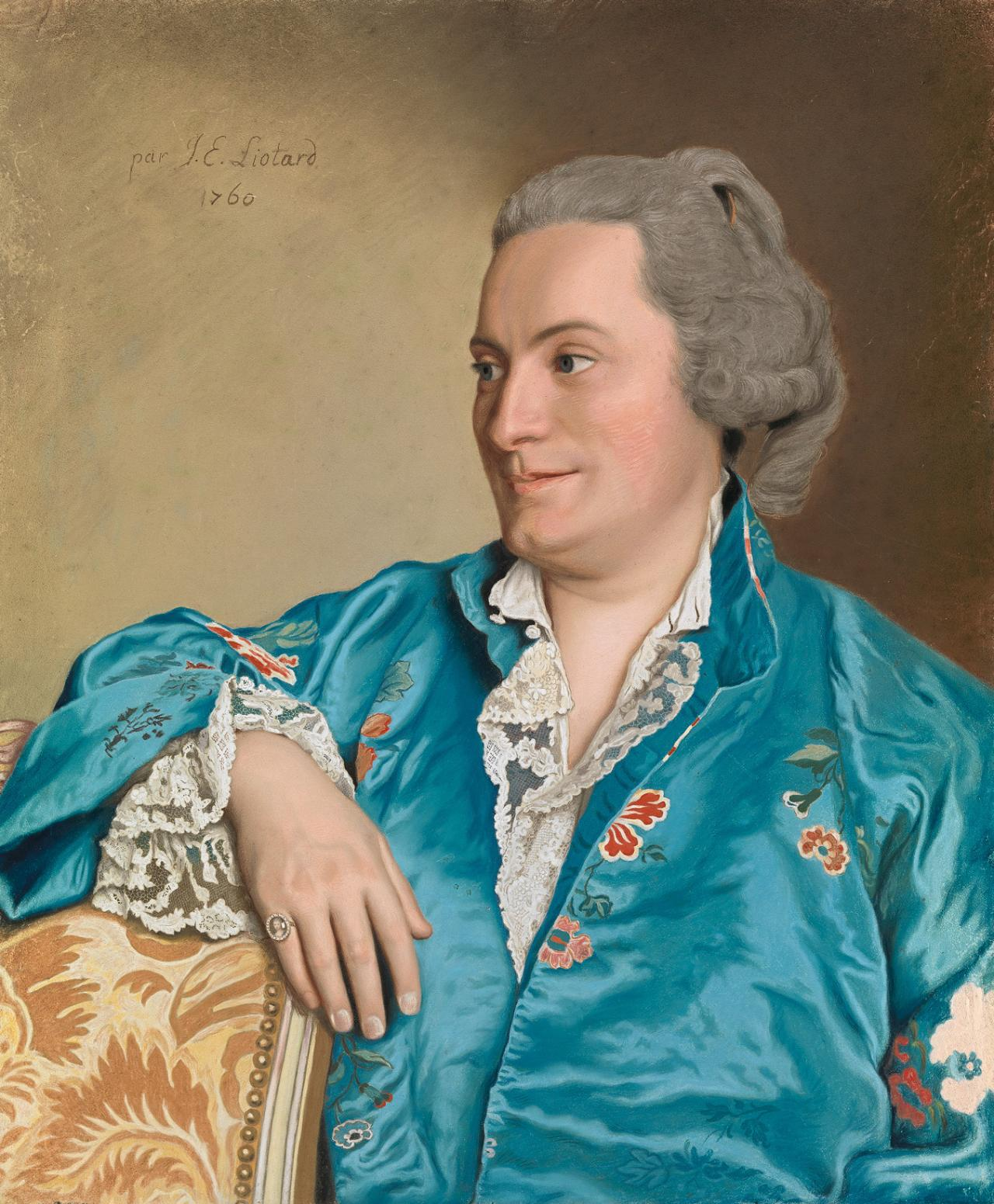
Portrait of his son, Isaac Louis de Thellusson, by Jean-Étienne Liotard, 1760

Through his son Peter, he was a grandfather of Anne Thellusson (1774–1849), who married Vice-Admiral William Lukin Windham in 1801, and had descendants including Diana, Princess of Wales, as well as her sons William, Prince of Wales heir to the British throne, and Prince Harry, Duke of Sussex. (Note: William Lukin Windham's daughter, Cecilia Anne Windham, was the second wife of banker Henry Baring, who were the parents of Edward Baring, 1st Baron Revelstoke. Lord Revelstoke's daughter, Hon. Margaret Baring, married Charles Spencer, 6th Earl Spencer. They were great-grandparents to Diana, Princess of Wales.)
