= Thellusson =

Thellusson is a surname. Notable people with the name include:

- Charles Thellusson (1770–1815), British banker and politician
- Claud Thomas Thellusson Wood MC (1885–1961), Bishop of Bedford
- Thomas Thellusson Carter (1808–1901), significant figure in the Victorian Church of England
- Frederick Thellusson, 4th Baron Rendlesham (1798–1852), British Conservative Party politician
- Frederick Thellusson, 5th Baron Rendlesham (1840–1911), British Conservative politician
- Georges-Tobie de Thellusson (1728–1776), French-Swiss banker
- Peter Thellusson (1737–1797), French–Swiss businessman and banker who settled in London
- Peter Thellusson, 1st Baron Rendlesham (1761–1808), British merchant, banker and politician

== See also ==
- Thellusson v Woodford (1799) 4 Ves 227 is an English trusts law case
- Hôtel Thellusson, luxurious hôtel particulier, built in 1778 by Claude-Nicolas Ledoux
