= Marr, South Yorkshire =

Village and civil parish in South Yorkshire, England

Coordinates: 53.542°N 1.225°W

Marr
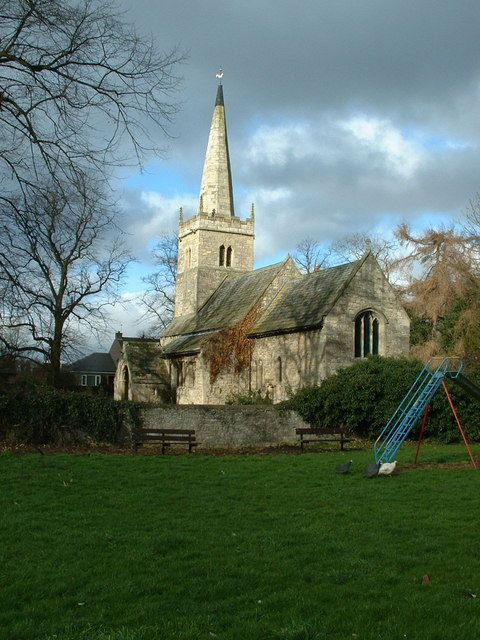
- St. Helen's church

- Location within City of Doncaster Location within South Yorkshire
- Population: 146 (2011)
- Metropolitan borough: City of Doncaster
- Metropolitan county: South Yorkshire
- Region: Yorkshire and the Humber
- Country: England
- Sovereign state: United Kingdom
- Post town: DONCASTER
- Postcode district: DN5
- Dialling code: 01302
- Police: South Yorkshire
- Fire: South Yorkshire
- Ambulance: Yorkshire
- UK Parliament: Doncaster North

Marr is a village and civil parish in the City of Doncaster district in South Yorkshire, England. It has a population of 138, increasing slightly to 146 at the 2011 Census. It was in the historical county of the West Riding and is listed in the Domesday Book (Domesday Book 307d) compiled in 1086 at the command of William the Conqueror at reference 307d. During feudal times, and even beyond, the manor was the basic administrative unit of the kingdom. The lord would be granted the land by a higher magnate in return for services - and that magnate would in turn receive his land from someone higher, all the way up to the king. Some manors were owned by abbeys, which were powerful landowners. The name Marr derives from the Old Norse marr meaning 'fen/marsh'.

Marr stands on the main road between Barnsley and Doncaster (A635 Barnsley Road) and also 5 minutes drive from the A1 (M) junction 37. Marr, although now mainly modern, does have a number of outstanding features; there remains an Iron Age barrow at the junction of Barnburgh, Marr and High Melton which can be seen through aerial photographs. Seventy Roman coins were found recently as evidence of the boundary line which Marr formed at Rickneild Street. The Gothic-style church of St Helen's has original herringbone masonry, early Norman chancel and nave, 13th/14th century short spire tower, 15th stone-ribbed porch and font and the pulpit has fine medieval woodwork. The church also contains figures of John Lewis and his wife dated from 1579 in brass and pieces of funeral armour. There are two further buildings of note in the Marr Hall Farm. Parts of the farm buildings are original 1800s and fairly unusual, the Hall itself retaining an Elizabethan/ Jacobean west side with a semi-circular entrance porch. This building is now (21st century) the farmhouse and has a Georgian style overall. The farm also contains more than 14 arched openings which would have been used for storage of carts, drays etc. The arches stand on solid stone piers and is thought to have been designed by Charles Sabine Augustus Thellusson an Italian architect who died in 1885.

The story of how Charles Thellusson (The Landed Gentry, Burke pages 598–600) gained control over the Brodsworth Estate (including the farm) is a saga in itself. The Thellusson family was involved in a long-running feud over inheritance money and Brodsworth Estates belonging originally to Peter Thellusson, a city merchant who died leaving the equivalent of £50 million in trust (see Thellusson Will Case). The money was put aside to gather interest during his own lifetime and the lifetime of his sons and grandsons (who were living at the time of his own death) only to be divided up between his remaining male descendants when the last of his three sons/grandsons died. The will and its subsequent litigation case (brought by his family) may even have inspired Charles Dickens for Bleak House (Jarndyce v Jarndyce) such was the controversy.

== See also ==
- Listed buildings in Marr, South Yorkshire
