= Brodsworth =

Village and civil parish in South Yorkshire, England

Coordinates: 53.5596°N 1.2370°W

- Village and civil parish
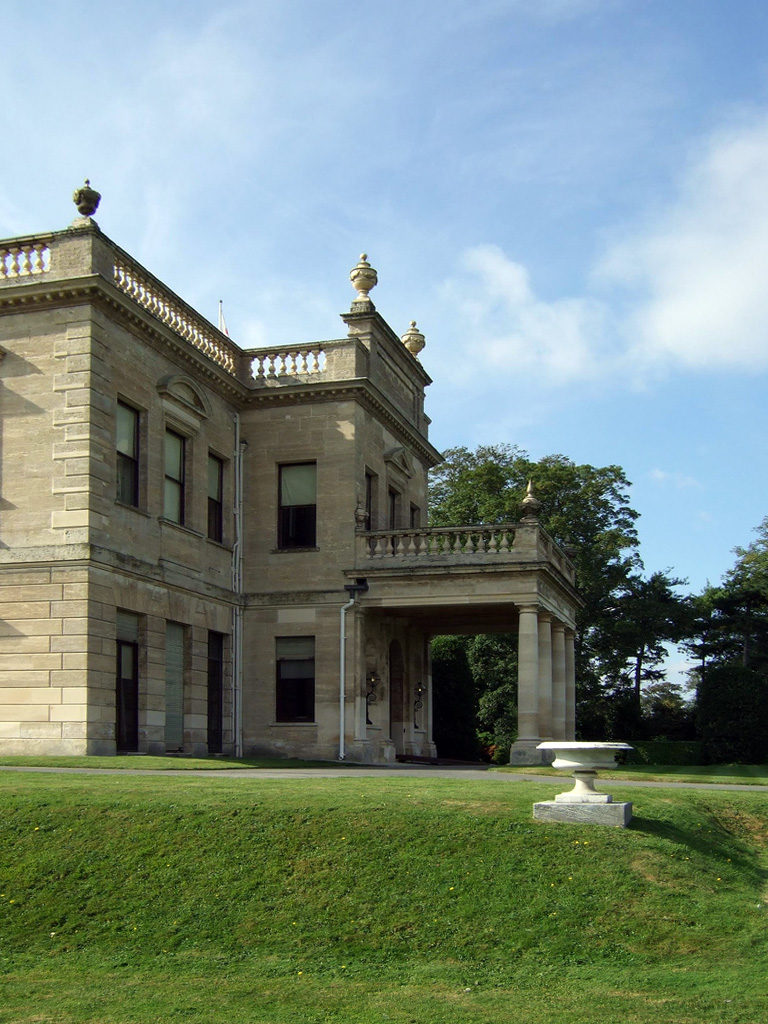
- Brodsworth Hall

- Location within South Yorkshire
- Area: 4.66 sq mi (12.1 km^{2})
- Population: 2,936 (2011 census)
  - Density: 630/sq mi (240/km^{2})
- Civil parish: Brodsworth
- Metropolitan borough: City of Doncaster
- Metropolitan county: South Yorkshire
- Region: Yorkshire and the Humber
- Country: England
- Sovereign state: United Kingdom
- Post town: DONCASTER
- Postcode district: DN5
- Dialling code: 01302
- Police: South Yorkshire
- Fire: South Yorkshire
- Ambulance: Yorkshire

Brodsworth is a village and civil parish in the City of Doncaster district in South Yorkshire, England. Situated about five miles north-west of Doncaster city centre, the parish also includes Scawsby and Pickburn. According to the 2001 census, it had a population of 2,875, increasing to 2,936 at the 2011 Census.

Historically, the parish of Brodsworth was much larger, but with the sinking of Brodsworth Colliery by the owners of Brodsworth Hall, the model village of Woodlands was built two miles away. On 1 April 1915, Woodlands was added to the parish of Adwick-le-Street since the colliery town had expanded to the stage where it joined Adwick. Brodsworth remained as a collection of farms and the estate village.

The name Brodsworth derives from either the Old Norse personal name Broddr or the Old English personal name Brord, and the Old English worð meaning 'enclosure'.

The village is on the B6422 road between Hooton Pagnell and Little Canada.

The local church, St Michael's, is an 11th-century church sited close to the hall built by the Thellusson family, owners of Brodsworth Hall, and is one of the four churches within the parish of Bilham, which is in the Sheffield diocese.

== See also ==
- Listed buildings in Brodsworth
