= Frederick Thellusson =

Frederick Thellusson may refer to:

- Frederick Thellusson, 4th Baron Rendlesham (1798–1852), MP for Suffolk East
- Frederick Thellusson, 5th Baron Rendlesham (1840–1911), MP for Suffolk East, son of the above

== See also ==
- Baron Rendlesham
