= Rendlesham =

Village in Suffolk, England

Coordinates: 52°07′48″N 01°24′49″E

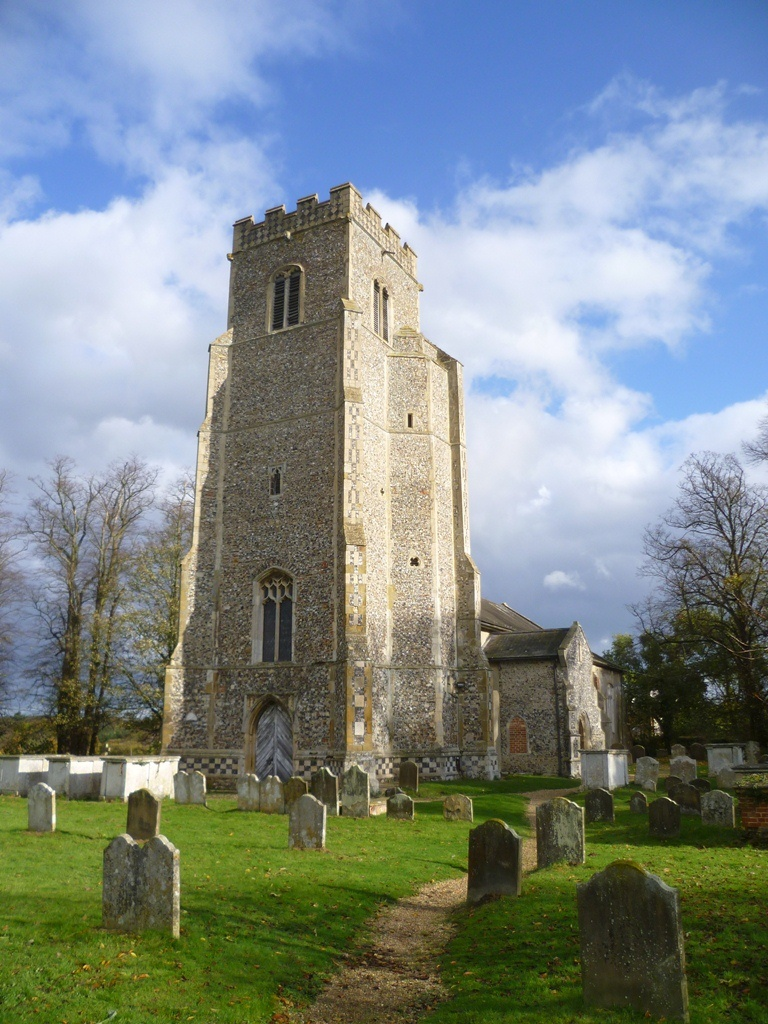
- Rendlesham, Church of St Gregory the Great

- Location within Suffolk
- Population: 3,013 (2011)
- District: East Suffolk
- Shire county: Suffolk
- Region: East
- Country: England
- Sovereign state: United Kingdom
- Post town: Woodbridge
- Postcode district: IP12
- UK Parliament: Suffolk Coastal

Rendlesham (UK: /ˈrɛn.dəl.ʃəm/) is a village and civil parish near Woodbridge, Suffolk, United Kingdom. It was a royal centre of authority for the king of the East Angles. The proximity of the Sutton Hoo ship burial may indicate a connection between Sutton Hoo and the East Anglian royal house, the Wuffingas. The king of Essex, Swithhelm (son of Seaxbald) who reigned from 660 to around 664, was baptised at Rendlesham by Bishop Cedd with King Æthelwold of East Anglia acting as his godfather. He died around the time of the great plague of 664 and may have been buried at the palace of Rendlesham.

An archaeology project has identified a large settlement of more than 124 acres (50 hectares).

Its name is recorded in Old English about 730 AD as Rendlæsham, which may mean "Homestead belonging to [a man named] Rendel", or it may come from a theorized Old English word *rendel = "little shore".

The Church of St Gregory the Great in Rendlesham is a Grade I listed medieval church. Rendlesham Hall, a large manor house, was demolished in 1949.

Rendlesham Forest, owned by Forestry England, is a 1,500-hectare (3,700-acre) mixed woodland with recreation facilities for walkers, cyclists and campers. It is part of the Sandlings Forest Site of Special Scientific Interest. The Rendlesham Forest incident was a series of reported sightings of unexplained pulsing lights off the coast of Orford Ness in December 1980.

During the summer of 2012, scenes of the movie Fast & Furious 6 were filmed on the former RAF Bentwaters airfield.

Some scholars have suggested Rendlesham as the site where the Old English epic poem Beowulf was first composed and performed.

== Governance ==
An East Suffolk electoral ward called Rendlesham & Orford exists. The former Rendlesham ward included Campsea Ashe and at the 2011 Census had a total population of 3,388.

== Notable residents ==
- Æthelwold of East Anglia Anglo-Saxon King of East Anglia who reigned between c. 654–664
- William Wheatcroft (by 1517 – 1558?), Member of Parliament for Ipswich in 1558
- Leonard Mawe (c. 1552 – 1629), Bishop of Bath and Wells and a Master of Peterhouse, Cambridge and Trinity College, Cambridge.
- Laurence Echard (c. 1670–1730), historian and clergyman
- Anne Hamilton, Duchess of Hamilton (1720–1771), aristocrat
- Peter Thellusson, 1st Baron Rendlesham (1761–1808), merchant, banker, and politician. He served as Member of Parliament for Midhurst, Malmesbury, Castle Rising, and Bossiney.
- Frederick Thellusson, 4th Baron Rendlesham (1798–1852), Member of Parliament for East Suffolk
- Frederick Thellusson, 5th Baron Rendlesham (1840–1911), Member of Parliament for East Suffolk
- Edith Austin (1867–1953), professional tennis player
- Michael Bunbury (1946- ), businessman and chairman of the Council of the Duchy of Lancaster

== See also ==
- HMS Rendlesham, a Ham class minesweeper
