= George Woodford Thellusson =

British politician

Member of Parliament for Barnstaple
- In office 9 May 1807 – 30 December 1811 Serving with William Taylor
- Preceded by: William Taylor; The Viscount Ebrington
- Succeeded by: William Taylor; William Busk

Member of Parliament for Tregony
- In office 20 August 1804 – 1 November 1806 Serving with Charles Cockerell
- Preceded by: The Marquess of Blandford; Charles Cockerell
- Succeeded by: Godfrey Wentworth Wentworth; James O'Callaghan

Member of Parliament for Southwark
- In office May 1796; 22 November 1796 – 21 December 1796 Serving with Henry Thornton
- Preceded by: Paul Le Mesurier; Henry Thornton
- Succeeded by: George Tierney; Henry Thornton

Personal details
- Born: 2 March 1764
- Died: 30 December 1811 (aged 47)
- Party: Tory
- Spouse: Mary Anne Fonnereau (after 1790)
- Relations: Peter Thellusson, 1st Baron Rendlesham (brother); Henry Oddie (grandson)
- Parent(s): Peter Thellusson; Ann Woodford
- Education: Haileybury College, Harrow School

George Woodford Thellusson (2 March 1764 – 30 December 1811), was a British merchant, banker and politician.

== Early life ==
Thelluson was born on 2 March 1764. He was the second son of Peter Thellusson, a wealthy London merchant, and his wife Ann Woodford, daughter of Matthew Woodford. Among his siblings were Peter Thellusson, 1st Baron Rendlesham and Charles Thellusson, MP for Evesham.

His father had emigrated to Britain from France in 1760 but the Thellusons were originally Huguenots who fled from France to Geneva after the Edict of Nantes. His grandfather, Issac de Thellusson, became Genevan ambassador at Paris to the Court of Louis XV, where his uncle, George, founded a banking house. After his father's death in July 1797, his considerable estate, including the Brodsworth estate, a large house known as Plaistow Lodge at Bromley in Kent, and plantations in Grenada and Montserrat, was embroiled in the Thellusson will case.

He was educated at Haileybury College and Harrow School in 1774.

== Career ==
A partner in his family's mercantile house, ″Peter Thellusson & Co.″, Thellusson signed the London merchants' declaration of loyalty to Pitt's government on 2 December 1795. He was the last of his three brothers to remain active in the family business, taking as his partners his nephew George Thellusson and one William Mitchell of Serjeant's Inn. The firm was then known as Thellusson, Nephew & Co.

In 1799, he bought Wall Hall (Aldenham) and sold it to the trustees of his father's infamous will in 1805. He served as a director of the East India Company between 1799 and 1807 and a director of the Imperial Insurance Company from 1803 until his death in 1811.

=== Political career ===
"Thellusson was noticed in the House before he obtained a seat there, as chairman of a meeting of claimants on property confiscated in Martinique whose memorial to the Duke of Portland caused controversy in the debates of May and June 1795." He stood for Southwark in the 1796 British general election as "a friend to the constitution" and "a friend to peace". His primary rival was the Irish Whig reformer George Tierney, uncle of his younger brother's wife. Thellusson spent heavily, "beat him into third place and promised after his election to support the constitution, though not as 'the servile tool of any administration.'"

On inquiry into Tierney's petition, Thellusson was "found guilty of treating offences and his election was declared void" on 11 November 1796. The following day his brother Peter asked Windham to inform Pitt that "if the family were to incur fresh trouble and expense at the Southwark by-election they required a 'reasonable assurance' of a peerage for their father or himself: otherwise George would leave Tierney to walk over and 'take a quiet seat for a borough in the Isle of Wight'. The response must have been encouraging for Thellusson contested the by-election against Tierney and was again successful. His second lease on the seat lasted a month before he was unseated on 21 December 1796.

Thellusson unsuccessfully contested Okehampton at the general election of 1802 and, in August 1804, considered standing for Barnstaple on a vacancy, but withdrew. He, instead, exploited the disarray in the affairs of the dying Richard Barwell to "secure his unopposed return for Tregony :in place of one of the sitting Members, Lord Blandford, who was seeking re-election after appointment to office." While he did not obtain a seat in the 1806 Parliament, he stood, and won, with the blessings of the Portland ministry for the borough of Barnstaple in 1807, serving until his death in 1811.

== Personal life ==
On 30 April 1790, Thellusson was married to Mary Anne Fonnereau, a daughter of Philip Fonnereau, MP for Aldeburgh, and Mary (née Parker) Fonnereau (a daughter of Armstead Parker, MP for Peterborough). Together, they were the parents of two daughters, including:

- Marianna Thellusson (died 1852), who died unnmarried.
- Georgina Thellusson (c. 1795–c. 1862), who married Henry Hoyle Oddie, son of solicitor Henry Hoyle Oddie.

Thellusson died on 30 December 1811.

=== Descendants ===
Through his daughter Georgina, he was posthumously a grandfather of Henry Oddie (1815–1869), a lawyer, landowner who played first-class cricket for Cambridge University between 1834 and 1836.

Parliament of Great Britain
Preceded by Henry Thornton; Paul Le Mesurier	Member of Parliament for Southwark; 1796–1796; With: Henry Thornton	Succeeded by Henry Thornton; George Tierney
Parliament of the United Kingdom
Preceded by The Marquess of Blandford; Charles Cockerell	Member of Parliament for Tregony; 1804–1806; With: Charles Cockerell	Succeeded by Godfrey Wentworth Wentworth; James O'Callaghan
Preceded by William Taylor; The Viscount Ebrington	Member of Parliament for Barnstaple; 1807–1811; With: William Taylor	Succeeded by William Taylor; William Busk
