= Sir James Sanderson, 1st Baronet =

English banker, MP, alderman and Lord Mayor of London

Sir James Sanderson Bt
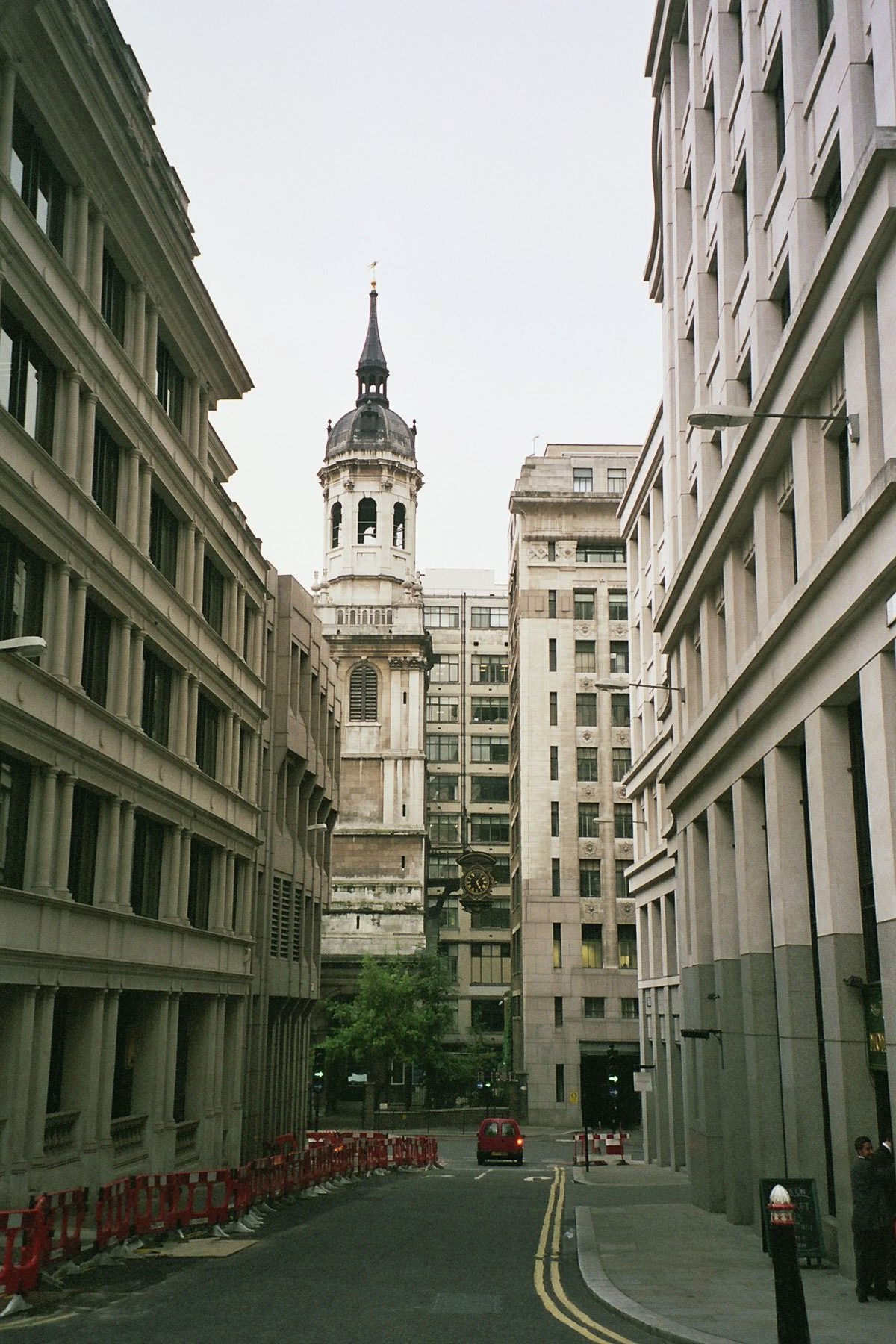
- St Magnus-the-Martyr church, where Sanderson is buried
- Born: 30 December 1741; York, Yorkshire, England
- Died: 21 June 1798 (aged 56)
- Resting place: St Magnus-the-Martyr church in the City of London
- Occupations: Politician, social reformer
- Employer(s): Sanderson & Co, Southwark
- Known for: Lord Mayor, Social reform
- Title: Baronet of the City of London
- Spouses: Elizabeth Judd; Elizabeth Skinner
- Parent: James Sanderson

Sir James Sanderson, 1st Baronet (30 December 1741 – 21 June 1798) was an English banker, a Member of Parliament, an alderman and Lord Mayor of London. He also served as president of Bridewell Hospital (now a school), and was a member of William Wilberforce's Proclamation Society for the Discouragement of Vice.

After he died his widow married William Huntington S.S., an eccentric and polemical preacher who regarded himself as a prophet. Huntington used his new riches to build a £10,000 chapel.

== Biography ==
James Sanderson was born in 1741. He was the only surviving son of James Sanderson of York. He started business buying and selling hops before becoming a banker at Mansion House Street in Southwark.

In 1785, by which time he was an alderman, he was elected Sheriff of London and knighted whilst in office. In 1792 he was elected Lord Mayor of the City of London. It was reported that this was a time:

... when the principles of the French Revolution were contaminating the minds of men, opinions which required to be counteracted by a firm, prudent, and constitutional chief magistrate.

In the same year he was one of the three men returned as Members of Parliament for the Parliamentary constituency of Malmesbury.

In 1793, Sanderson became president of Bridewell Hospital where he is acknowledged to have transformed the way it was managed. The hospital took in poor people and was a cross between a prison and a school. Later the institution's two roles were split, and in time the school became King Edward's School, Witley. Sanderson was a member of William Wilberforce's Proclamation Society, which had been founded following a 1787 royal proclamation instituted by Wilberforce via the Archbishop of Canterbury. The Proclamation for the Discouragement of Vice was intended to be a remedy for a perceived rise in immorality. Sanderson was also a member of the Philanthropic Society and the vice-president of Magdelen Hospital.

On 6 December 1794, Sanderson became Sir James Sanderson, Baronet of London.

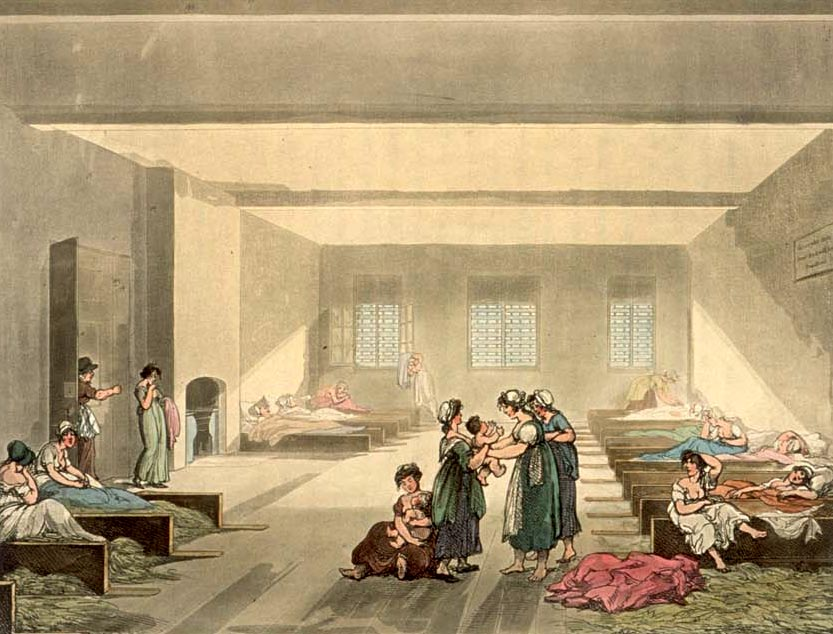
The inmates of Bridewell (c. 1808) where Sanderson was president (a governor)

In the following parliamentary election he was returned as the member for Hastings together with Nicholas Vansittart. Vansittart went on to be one of the most successful Chancellors of the Exchequer, whilst Sanderson became a friend and admirer of William Pitt the Younger and was "a favourite" of him and the king.

Sanderson was married twice, first to Elizabeth Judd of Chelmsford. By his second wife, Elizabeth (née Skinner), Sanderson gave his name via his daughter, Elizabeth Skinner Sanderson, to his grandson, the physician Sir John Burdon-Sanderson. (Sanderson had made it a condition of his will that his heirs should take his surname; and in 1815 his new family took his arms, from 1794, as well.) A painting of him, from which he was described as handsome, was placed in the court room of Bridewell Royal Hospital. (The painting was at King Edward's School, Witley in 2004.) Sanderson's memorial at St Magnus-the-Martyr church in the City of London was thought notable by the architectural historian, Nikolaus Pevsner.

After he died in 1799, his widow married William Huntington S.S. Huntington preached at several chapels to rich and loyal congregations. His stepdaughter's father, Thomas Skinner was Lord Mayor from 1794 to 1795. Huntington had become involved with Lady Sanderson in about 1802, but his first wife did not die until 1806. After their marriage in 1808, Lady Sanderson continued to use Sanderson's surname whilst Huntington built a new chapel costing £10,000 (£679,000 as of 2025).

Lady Sanderson did not die until 1817, so she would have seen her husband's tombstone—on which his self-written epitaph identified him as a prophet.

== Works ==
- Observations and examples to assist magistrates in setting the assize of bread made of wheat ... 1759

Parliament of Great Britain
Preceded by Benjamin Bond-Hopkins; Paul Benfield	Member of Parliament for Malmesbury; 1792–1796; With: Benjamin Bond-Hopkins (1792–1794); Francis Glanville (1794–1796)	Succeeded by Samuel Smith; Peter Thellusson
Preceded by Robert Dundas; John Stanley	Member of Parliament for Hastings; 1796–1798; With: Nicholas Vansittart	Succeeded by William Sturges; Nicholas Vansittart
Civic offices
Preceded by John Hopkins	Lord Mayor of the City of London; 1792	Succeeded by Paul Le Mesurier
Baronetage of Great Britain
New creation	Baronet (of the City of London); 1794–1798	Extinct
Preceded by Curtis baronets	Sanderson baronets of the City of London; 6 December 1794	Succeeded by Willoughby baronets
