= Rendlesham Hall =

Manor house in Rendlesham, Suffolk, England

Coordinates: 52°08′02″N 1°24′49″E

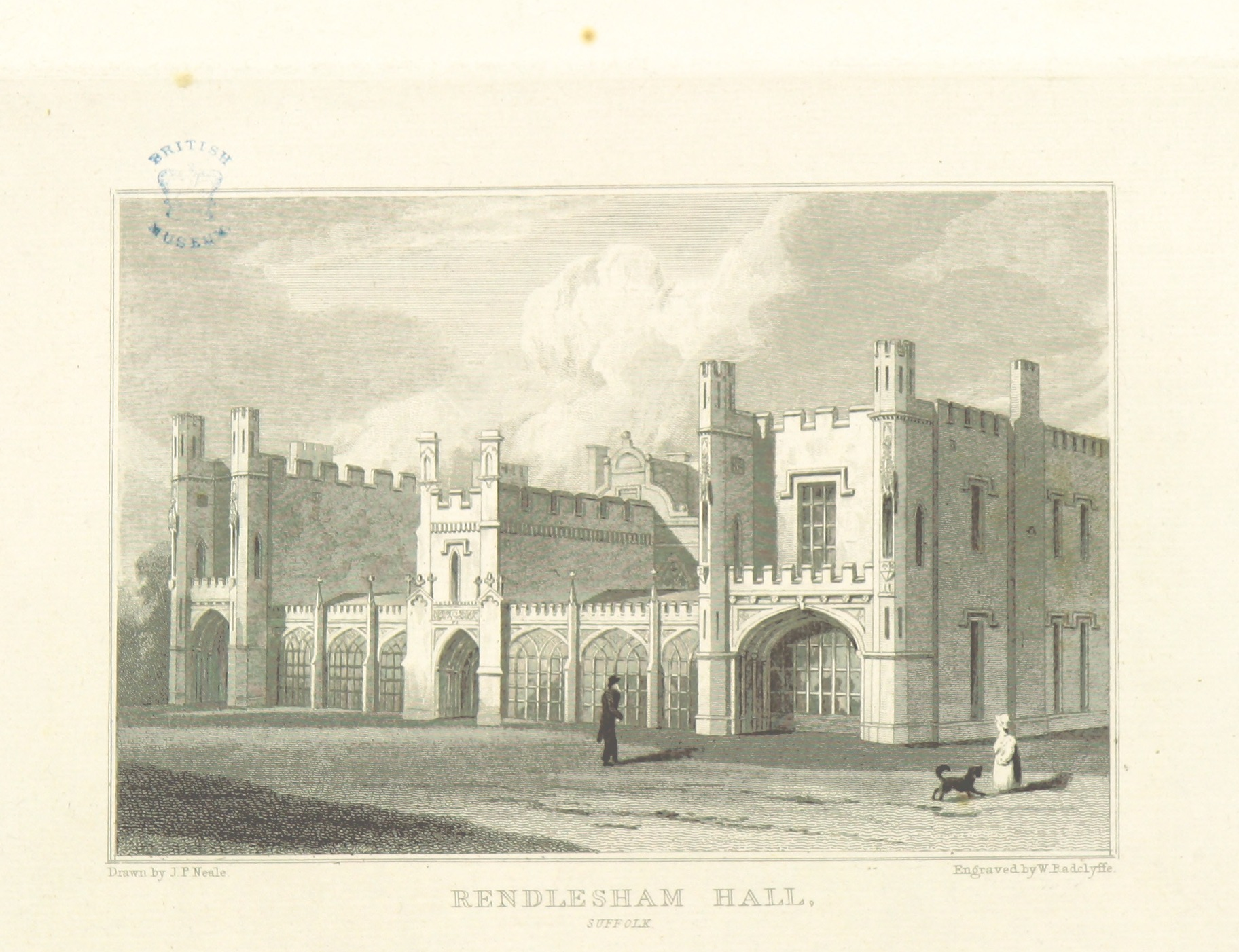
The original house as it looked in 1818

Rendlesham Hall was a large manor house in the village of Rendlesham in Suffolk.

== History ==
The hall was built in the pointed style in 1780 and two lodges, Woodbridge Lodge and Ivy Lodge, were added in 1790. The hall was acquired by Peter Thellusson, a wealthy banker, in the name of his son, in 1796. The son, Peter Thellusson, 1st Baron Rendlesham, who went into politics as a Member of Parliament, occupied the hall.

The hall was destroyed by fire in 1830 and was rebuilt in Jacobean style to a design by William Burn. The works, which were carried out by Lucas Brothers were completed in 1870. The new building had eight reception rooms, including a ballroom, a conservatory, twenty-five principal bedrooms with dressing rooms, nine secondary and thirteen servants' bedrooms, five bathrooms, eleven lavatories and extensive domestic offices. There were 25 acres (10 ha) of grounds with tennis and croquet lawns, and a 4-acre (16,000 m^{2}) walled kitchen garden in a park which extended to 250 acres (1.0 km^{2}).

The 5th Lord Rendlesham died in 1911, and the hall was put up for sale in 1920, but there were no bidders. In 1923 the hall was sold for use as a sanatorium, in which use it remained until the Second World War, when it was occupied by the British Army. For over 80 years the hall had played a major role in the social life of Suffolk, but after World War II it stood empty, and it was finally demolished in 1949.

== Images ==
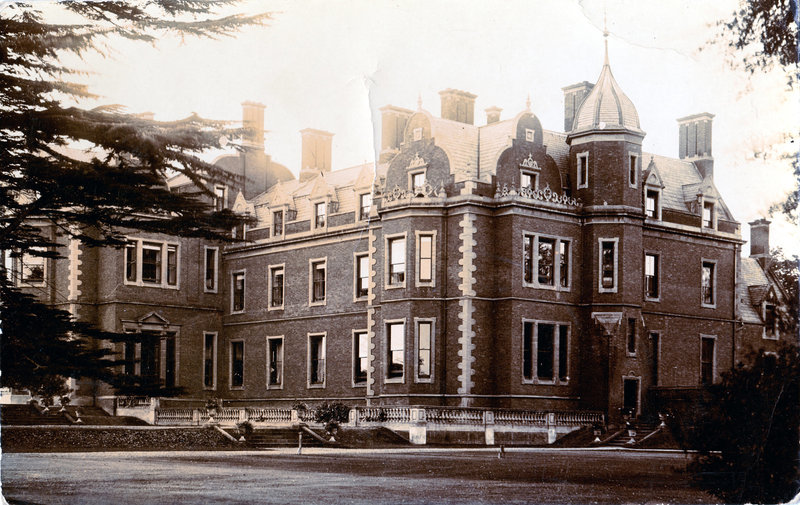
The east end of the house

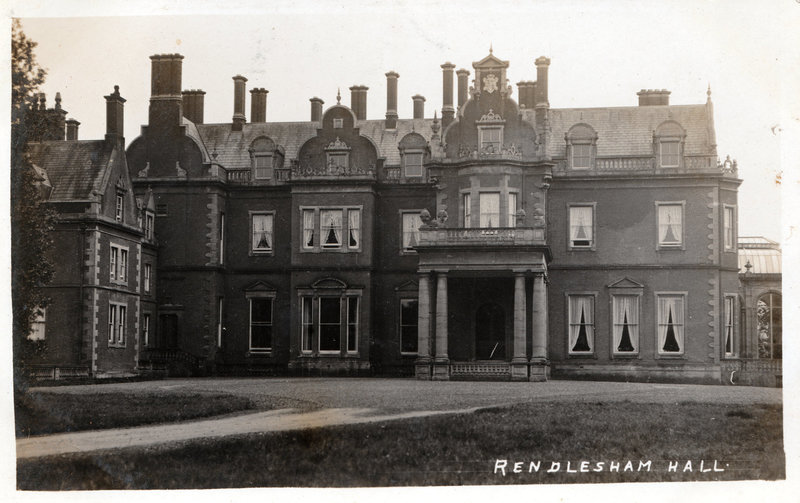
The north end, showing the main entrance

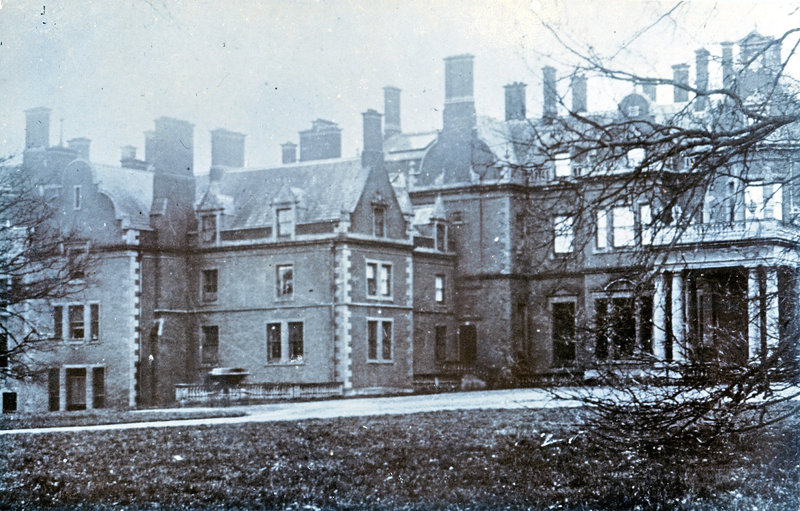
The north end

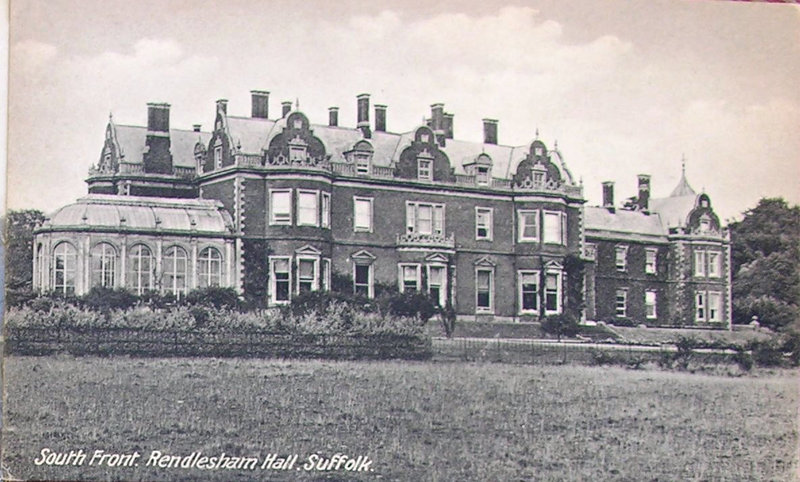
The south end

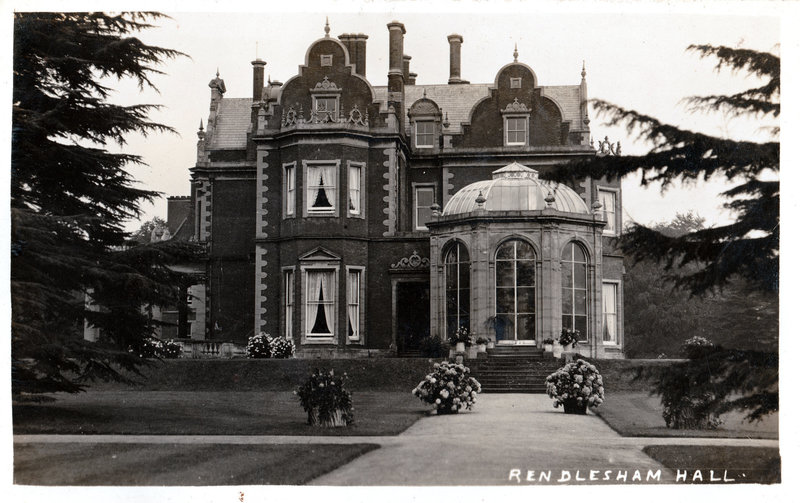
The west end, showing the greenhouse

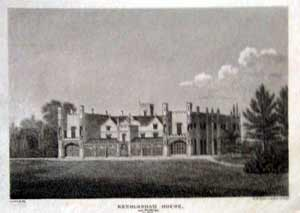
Rendlesham Hall c. 1800
