= Listed buildings in Brodsworth =

Brodsworth is a civil parish in the metropolitan borough of Doncaster, South Yorkshire, England. The parish contains 24 listed buildings that are recorded in the National Heritage List for England. Of these, one is listed at Grade I, the highest of the three grades, one is at Grade II*, the middle grade, and the others are at Grade II, the lowest grade. The parish contains the village of Brodsworth and the surrounding area. The most important building in the parish is Brodsworth Hall, which is listed, together with associated structures and items in the gardens and grounds. The other listed buildings include houses, cottages and associated structures, farmhouses and farm buildings, a church, a milepost, and a school.

== Key ==
Grade	Criteria
I	Buildings of exceptional interest, sometimes considered to be internationally important
II*	Particularly important buildings of more than special interest
II	Buildings of national importance and special interest

== Buildings ==
Name and location	Photograph	Date	Notes	Grade
St Michael's Church; 53.55928°N 1.23650°W		11th century	The church was later altered and extended, especially in about 1200, and it was restored in 1874–75 by C. Hodgson Fowler. It is built in limestone, with roofs of tile and metal sheet. The church consists of a nave, north and south aisles, a chancel with a north chapel and vestry and a south chapel, and a west tower. The tower has three stages, angle buttresses, bell windows with two lights and four-centred arched heads, the east window with a round arch and spandrels, and a clock face above. At the top are gargoyles and an embattled parapet, and there is an embattled parapet along the south wall of the nave.	II*
Scawsby Hall; 53.54008°N 1.18899°W		Mid 17th century	A farmhouse later divided, it is in roughcast limestone and has a roof of stone slate and pantiles, with moulded gable copings and shaped kneelers on the right. There is a T-shaped plan, with a front range of three storeys and two bays, and two-storey wings to the left and at the rear. The main range has a porch with columns, a dentilled cornice, and a pediment. Most of the windows are sashes, some horizontally-sliding, and at the rear is a three-light mullioned and transomed window.	II
Archery Pavilion; 53.55841°N 1.24074°W		Early 18th century	The pavilion is in the grounds of Brodsworth Hall, and the roof dates from 1866. It is in stone, with rusticated quoins, overhanging eaves supported by wooden poles, and has a roof in timber and Welsh slate, with pierced bargeboards, and finials. There is a single storey, and on the front is a Venetian window, with Ionic pilasters, and a full entablature with a pulvinated frieze. The lights have Gothic glazing, and above it is a circular window.	II
The Brewhouse; 53.55971°N 1.23812°W	—	Mid 18th century	The brewhouse to Brodsworth Hall, later converted for residential use, is in rendered limestone, with a sill band, and a stone slate roof with coped gables. There are two storeys and attics, and sides of four bays. The entrance front has two gables, and contains an arcade of four arches with impost bands and keystones. The left arch contains a doorway, the others have casement windows, above them is a sash window, and in each gable is a Diocletian window.	II
The Gatehouse; 53.56004°N 1.23778°W	—	Mid 18th century	A vicarage, it has been extended, and later a private house, it is rendered, and has a pantile roof with coped gables and shaped kneelers. There are three storeys, three bays, a projecting right wing, and an outshut in the angle. The windows in the original part are sashes, some horizontally-sliding, and in the later part they are casements.	II
Old Stables; 53.55919°N 1.23929°W		Mid to late 18th century	The former stables to Brodsworth Hall are in limestone with quoins and a stone slate roof. There are two storeys, a front of seven bays, and rear wings and buildings enclosing the yard. The end and middle three bays on the front project with pedimented gables containing quatrefoils in the tympani. In the centre is a round-arched carriage entrance with piers, an impost band, and a keystone, it is flanked by two similar blind arches, and above them are casement windows. Each floor of the outer bays contains a casement window, in the ground floor within an arch.	II
Gates and gatepiers (northeast); 53.55976°N 1.23489°W	—	Late 18th century (probable)	The gate piers at the northeast entrance to the grounds of Brodsworth Hall are in limestone, and the gates are in wrought iron. The piers are short and square, and each pier has a moulded plinth, a festoon on the front and rear, a moulded cornice, and a ball finial. The gates have decorative lower panels and plain bars, with finials flanked by scrolled stiles.	II
Gates and gatepiers (east-northeast); 53.55827°N 1.23515°W		Late 18th century (probable	The gate piers at the east-northeast entrance to the grounds of Brodsworth Hall are in limestone, and the gates are in wrought iron. The piers are short and square, and each pier has a moulded plinth, a festoon on the front and rear, a moulded cornice, and a ball finial. The single gate has horizontal bars, cross braces and an emblem, and decorative scrollwork to the top rail with a barbed finial.	II
Gate piers and walls, Bilham Lodge; 53.55528°N 1.25470°W		Early 19th century	The piers and the walls at the western entrance to the grounds of Brodsworth Hall are in limestone. A pair of piers flanks the central entrance, another pair flank the side entrances, and concave walls link these to end piers. Each pier has a plinth, a shaft of large blocks, a cornice, and a ball finial, and the walls have coping.	II
Gates and gatepiers (east); 53.55905°N 1.22755°W		Early 19th century	The gate piers at the eastern entrance to the grounds of Brodsworth Hall are in limestone, and the gates are in iron. A pair of piers flanks the central entrance, another pair flank the side entrances, and concave walls link these to end piers. The piers are short and square, and each pier has a moulded plinth and a cornice, and the walls have coping. The gates are cross-braced with central emblems.	II
Milepost; 53.53970°N 1.18281°W		Early 19th century (probable)	The milepost is on the south side of Barnsley road (A635 road). It is in siltstone, and consists of a round-headed slab inscribed with the distances to Barnsley and Doncaster.	II
Garden Temple and Icehouse; 53.55665°N 1.24001°W		Early 19th century (probable)	The temple is a building on a mound containing an ice house in the grounds of Brodsworth Hall. It is in limestone, and consists of a tetrastyle Doric temple with a balustrade. Inside is a semi-domed niche. The ice house is entered from the rear.	II
Glebe Farmhouse; 53.55991°N 1.23968°W	—	Early to mid 19th century	The farmhouse is in limestone with deep eaves and a hipped Welsh slate roof. There are two storeys and three bays. The central doorway has a semicircular fanlight and a cornice, and the windows are sashes.	II
Tudor Cottage; 53.54078°N 1.18833°W	—	Early to mid 19th century	The cottage is rendered, and has a stone slate roof with a scrolled bargeboard . There are two storeys, two bays, and a short rear wing. In the centre is a porch with chamfered inner and outer doorways, and a gable with decorative bargeboards. This is flanked by casement windows with chamfered surrounds and hood moulds. In the upper floor are gabled half-dormers with decorative bargeboards. The right return contains a doorway, above which is a canted bay window on curved brackets.	II
Brodsworth First and Middle School; 53.56110°N 1.22766°W	—	Mid 19th century	The school is roughcast and has a Welsh slate roof. In the centre is a gabled two-storey block flanked by single-storey wings with three bays, and there is a taller extension to the left. The doorways and windows are in Gothic style with pointed-arched heads.	II
Home Farmhouse; 53.55899°N 1.24037°W		Mid 19th century	The farmhouse is in limestone with deep eaves and a hipped Welsh slate roof. There are two storeys, three bays, and a single-strey recessed lean-to on the left. The central doorway has a fanlight and a cornice, and the windows are sashes.	II
Eyecatcher; 53.55686°N 1.24048°W		c. 1860	The folly in the grounds of Brodsworth Hall is in stone. It consists of a blocked central doorway with a moulded surround and a pediment. It is flanked by blocked windows, and the side walls are irregularly stepped.	II
Fernery banks, bridges and pergolas 53.55781°N 1.24021°W		c. 1860	The fernery banks, bridges, and pergolas are in the grounds of Brodsworth Hall. The fernery banks are in stone and consist of banks of terrace walls over which are gravelled paths, with flanking embattled walls surmounted by cast iron chain pergolas. These link two segmental arched bridges with cast iron balustrades. On the east bank is a segmental-arched alcove with coping and two urns.	II
Rose Pergola; 53.55867°N 1.24020°W		c. 1860	The pergola is in The Grove, in the garden of Brodsworth Hall. It has a curved plan, with 23 thin cast iron columns on each side, each with an ornate finial. Each pair of columns is linked by an iron arch, and there are six arched entrances.	II
Brodsworth Hall; 53.55759°N 1.23765°W		1861–63	A country house in Italianate style, built in limestone, with roofs of lead and slate. There are two storeys, an entrance front of nine bays, a garden front of 13 bays, and a double service wing at the rear. The entrance front has a rusticated ground floor and quoins above, a floor band, a modillion eaves cornice, and a balustrade with urn finials. The middle three bays project and have a tetrastyle porte-cochère with a balustrade and urns. The double doors have a fanlight, and side niches flanked by pilasters. The windows contain transomed casements, the middle opening in the upper floor has an architrave and a triangular pediment, and in the fourth and seventh bays they have architraves, aprons and segmental pediments.	I
Elms Farmhouse; 53.56020°N 1.22185°W	—	1864	The farmhouse is rendered, on a plinth, with quoins, and a hipped slate roof. There are two storeys, and fronts of three bays. The middle bay of the main front is narrower, and projects under a coped gable with shaped kneelers. It contains a double door with pilasters and a pediment, and above it is a casement window and a quatrefoil panel. The outer bays contain canted bay windows with sash windows above.	II
Farm buildings, Elms Farm; 53.56023°N 1.22104°W	—	1864	The farm buildings are in limestone with Welsh slate roofs, forming a quadrangle divided by a wall in the centre. The front range has two storeys, and the others mainly have a single storey. In the front range are seven bays, the end bays gabled, on a plinth, with quoins. The gabled bays contain blocked ground floor windows, casement windows above and an oculus with keystones. In the left range is a two-storey five-bay barn containing a segmental-arched wagon entry with a quoined surround and a date panel. The right range contains a cart shed with a four-arched arcade.	II
Fountain and urns 53.55717°N 1.23930°W		1866–67	The fountain and urns are in a formal garden in the grounds of Brodsworth Hall, and are in marble. The fountain is in the centre, and has an octagonal moulded dwarf wall forming a rim. The fountain has a moulded base and a shaft decorated with carved dolphins, there are three tiers in the form of scalloped shells, and a bird finial with an upthrust beak. The four urns are at the corners of the garden and have gadrooned bases and broad rims.	II
Group of ten statues 53.55716°N 1.23767°W		1866–67	The statues are arranged at intervals along the south and east sides of the garden of Brodsworth Hall. They are in marble, and each consists of a female figure on a square pedestal with a moulded plinth and a cornice.	II
Terrace steps and urns 53.55737°N 1.23749°W		1866–67	There are three sets of steps along the south front of Brodsworth Hall and one set on the west side. Each set has seven steps flanked by coped walls, rising up to marble urns on square bases. At the foot of each wall is a carved greyhound.	II
