= Peter Thellusson, 1st Baron Rendlesham =

British politician

The Right Honourable The Lord Rendlesham

Member of Parliament for Bossiney
- In office 1807–1808 Serving with James Stuart-Wortley-Mackenzie
- Preceded by: James Stuart-Wortley-Mackenzie; Henry Baring
- Succeeded by: James Stuart-Wortley-Mackenzie; The Earl of Desart

Member of Parliament for Castle Rising
- In office 1802–1806 Serving with Charles Bagot-Chester
- Preceded by: Charles Bagot-Chester; Horatio Churchill
- Succeeded by: Charles Bagot-Chester; Richard Sharp

Member of Parliament for Malmesbury
- In office 1801–1802 Serving with Philip Metcalfe
- Preceded by: Parliament of Great Britain
- Succeeded by: Claude Scott; Samuel Scott

Member of Parliament for Malmesbury
- In office 1796–1801 Serving with Samuel Smith, Philip Metcalfe
- Preceded by: Sir James Sanderson; Francis Glanville
- Succeeded by: Parliament of the United Kingdom

Member of Parliament for Midhurst
- In office 1795–1796 Serving with Percy Charles Wyndham
- Preceded by: Percy Charles Wyndham; Charles William Wyndham
- Succeeded by: Sylvester Douglas; Charles Long

Personal details
- Born: Peter Isaac Thellusson; 13 October 1761
- Died: 16 September 1808 (aged 46)
- Spouse: Elizabeth Eleanor Cornwall (after 1783)
- Relations: George Woodford Thellusson (brother)
- Children: 7
- Parent(s): Peter Thellusson; Ann Woodford
- Education: Harrow School

Peter Isaac Thellusson, 1st Baron Rendlesham (13 October 1761 – 16 September 1808), was a British merchant, banker and politician.

== Early life ==
Thelluson was born on 13 October 1761. He was the eldest son of Peter Thellusson, a wealthy London merchant, and his wife Ann Woodford, daughter of Matthew Woodford. Among his siblings were Charles Thellusson, MP for Evesham, and George Woodford Thellusson, MP for Southwark, Tregony, and Barnstaple.

His father had emigrated to Britain from France in 1760 but the Thellusons were originally Huguenots who fled from France to Geneva after the Edict of Nantes. His grandfather, Isaac de Thellusson, became Genevan ambassador at Paris to the Court of Louis XV, where his uncle, George, founded a banking house. After his father's death in July 1797, his considerable estate, including the Brodsworth estate, a large house known as Plaistow Lodge at Bromley in Kent, and plantations in Grenada and Montserrat, was embroiled in the Thellusson will case.

He was educated at Harrow School in 1774.

== Career ==
Thellusson took over the thriving family business from his father. Like his father he also became a director of the Bank of England from 1787 to 1806. He also served as Lt.-Col. Commandant of the Rendlesham Volunteers in 1798 and Captain Commandant in 1803.

He was returned as a Member of Parliament on a vacancy for Lord Egremont's borough of Midhurst from 1795 to 1796, for Malmesbury from 1796 to 1802. At the general election, he was returned for Castle Rising as "a paying guest of the Prince of Wales's friend Lord Cholmondeley" from 1802 to 1806 and for Bossiney from 1807 to 1808.

Thellusson acquired the Rendlesham estate for £51,400 and invested in East India Company stock.

=== Peerage ===
As early as January 1795, Theullusson supported William Pitt and earned a reputation as a peerage-hunter. In July 1805 he asked Pitt to "expedite an earlier promise to recommend him for an Irish peerage by invoking the power vested in the crown" by the Acts of Union 1800 to create one new peer when three Irish titles had become extinct, as they had, so Thellusson claimed, with the deaths of the Earl of Mountrath, Viscount Bateman and Lord Ross in 1802. While Thellusson was mistaken, because Mountrath's barony passed by special remainder to Charles Henry Coote, upon Baron Holmes's death in 1804, the required three were obtained. While the title was delayed, it was eventually conferred on 1 February 1806 as Baron Rendlesham, of Rendlesham in Suffolk.

== Personal life ==
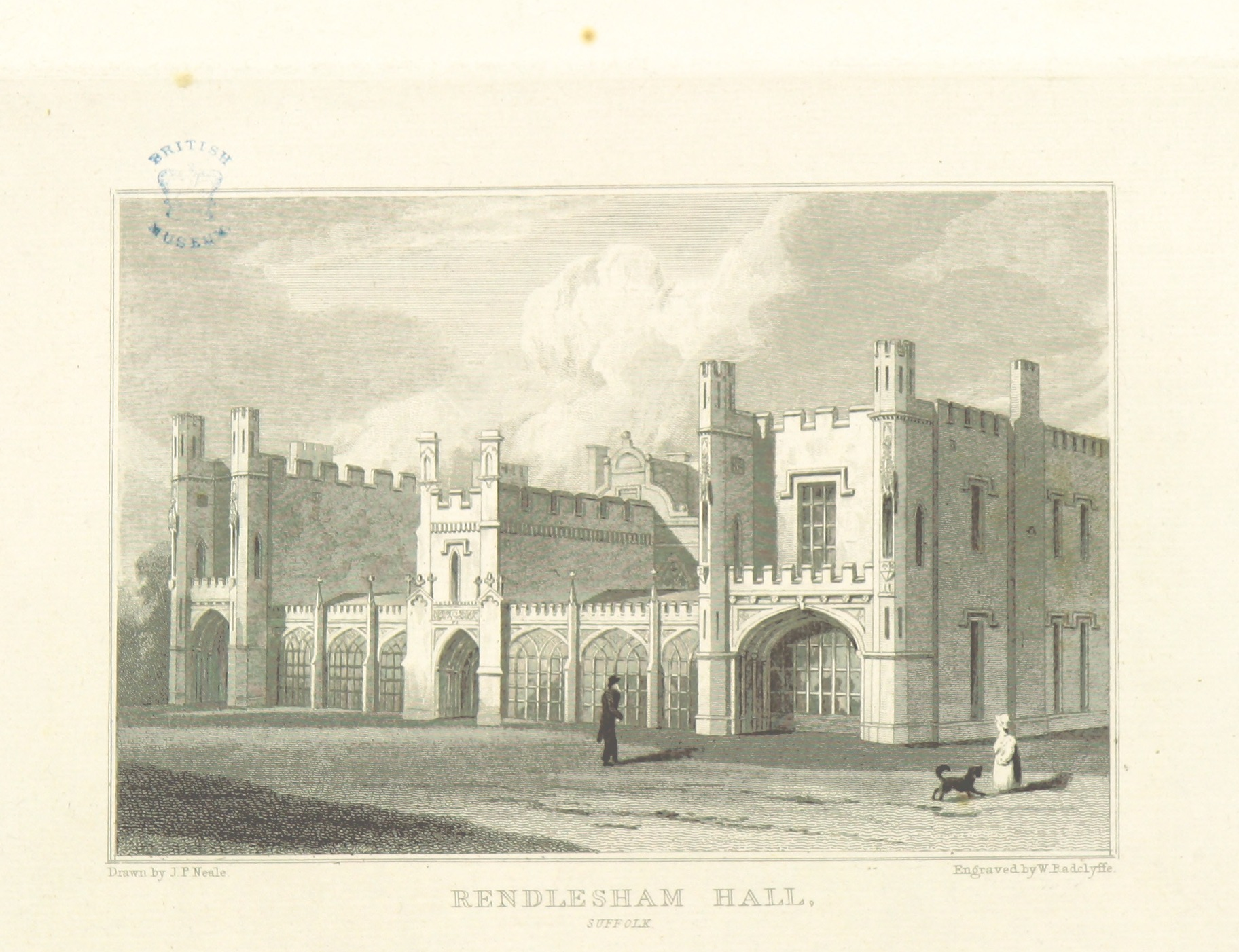
Rendlesham Hall, 1818

On 14 June 1783 Thellusson was married to Elizabeth Eleanora Cornwall, the daughter of John Cornwall, a Russia merchant of Hendon, Middlesex. Together, they were the parents of six sons and one daughter, including:

- John Thellusson, 2nd Baron Rendlesham (1785–1832), who married Mary Andalusia Dickens, daughter of Lt.-Gen. Samuel Trevor Dickens, in 1809. After her death, he married Ann Sophia Tatnall, daughter of William Tatnall, in 1816.
- Hon. George Thellusson (1791–1813), a Lieutenant in the 11th Dragoons who was killed in action at the Battle of Vitoria in 1813.
- Hon. Caroline Thellusson (1793–1862), who married Charles Crabb Boulton.
- William Thellusson, 3rd Baron Rendlesham (1798–1839), the Vicar at Aldenham who married Lucy Pratt, daughter of Edward Roger Pratt, in 1826.
- Frederick Thellusson, 4th Baron Rendlesham (1798–1852), who married Elizabeth Charlotte Prescott, daughter of Sir George Prescott, 2nd Baronet, in 1838.
- Hon. Edmund Thellusson (1799–1818), who drowned in 1818.
- Hon. Arthur Thellusson (1801–1858), who married Caroline Anna Maria Bethell-Codrington, daughter of Christopher Bethell-Codrington and Hon. Caroline Foley (daughter of the 2nd Baron Foley), in 1826.

Lord Rendlesham, who lived at Rendlesham Hall, died in September 1808, aged only 46, but with a fortune said to be £400,000. He was succeeded in the barony by his eldest son John.

Parliament of Great Britain
Preceded by Percy Charles Wyndham; Charles William Wyndham	Member of Parliament for Midhurst; 1795–1796; With: Percy Charles Wyndham	Succeeded by Sylvester Douglas; Charles Long
Preceded by Sir James Sanderson; Francis Glanville	Member of Parliament for Malmesbury; 1796–1801; With: Samuel Smith 1796; Philip Metcalfe 1796–1800	Succeeded by Parliament of the United Kingdom
Parliament of the United Kingdom
Preceded by Parliament of Great Britain	Member of Parliament for Malmesbury; 1801–1802; With: Philip Metcalfe	Succeeded by Claude Scott; Samuel Scott
Preceded by Charles Bagot-Chester; Horatio Churchill	Member of Parliament for Castle Rising; 1802–1806; With: Charles Bagot-Chester	Succeeded by Charles Bagot-Chester; Richard Sharp
Preceded by James Stuart-Wortley-Mackenzie; Henry Baring	Member of Parliament for Bossiney; 1807–1808; With: James Stuart-Wortley-Mackenzie	Succeeded by James Stuart-Wortley-Mackenzie; The Earl of Desart
Peerage of Ireland
New creation	Baron Rendlesham; 1806–1808	Succeeded by John Thelluson
