= Henry Oddie =

English lawyer, landowner, and cricketer

Henry Hoyle Oddie (31 January 1815 – 21 May 1869) was an English lawyer, landowner, and a cricketer who played first-class cricket for Cambridge University between 1834 and 1836.

== Early life ==
Oddie was born in London on 31 January 1815. He was the son of Henry Hoyle Oddie, and the former Georgina Thellusson (c. 1795–c. 1862), the daughter of George Woodford Thellusson.

Oddie was educated at Eton College and Trinity College, Cambridge.

== Career ==
He played as batsman in seven first-class matches for the Cambridge side over three seasons; he batted in the middle and lower order, though not with any success in any position as his highest score was just 14 and he averaged just 5.57 with the bat. There is no record that he bowled in first-class cricket. In 1836, he played in the university match against Oxford University, scoring 9 and 3 and taking his only recorded catch.

Oddie graduated from Cambridge University with a Bachelor of Arts degree in 1837 and was admitted to the Middle Temple the same year.

== Personal life ==
He was married with twelve children. He had a large staff of servants. He lived at Tilgate Manor, Worth, Sussex where he farmed a large leased estate until moving back to Colney House, at Shenley, Hertfordshire, on his father's death. The family's London residence was at 18 Carey Street (which was 18 and 20 knocked together) and also the place of business for their law practice.

Oddie died on 21 May 1869 at Colney House, St Albans, in Hertfordshire.
