= Listed buildings in Marr, South Yorkshire =

Marr is a civil parish in the metropolitan borough of Doncaster, South Yorkshire, England. The parish contains six listed buildings that are recorded in the National Heritage List for England. Of these, one is listed at Grade I, the highest of the three grades, and the others are at Grade II, the lowest grade. The parish contains the village of Marr and the surrounding area. All the listed buildings are in the village, and consist of a church, a former manor house and associated structures, a farmhouse, and farm buildings.

== Key ==
Grade	Criteria
I	Particularly important buildings of more than special interest
II	Buildings of national importance and special interest

== Buildings ==
Name and location	Photograph	Date	Notes	Grade
St Helen's Church; 53.54219°N 1.22501°W		12th century	The church was extended and altered through the centuries. It is in limestone with stone slate roofs, and consists of a nave, a south aisle, a south porch, a chancel, and a west tower. The tower has buttresses, lean-tos on the north and south sides, lancet windows, bell openings with ogee heads, a string course with gargoyles, an embattled parapet with corner crocketed pinnacles, and a recessed octagonal spire with a weathervane.	I
Marr Hall; 53.54155°N 1.22093°W	—	16th century	The oldest part of the former manor house is the west front, the south front being altered in the 19th century. The house is in limestone, with tile eaves courses and a pantile roof, two storeys and an L-shaped plan. The west front has a chamfered plinth, two bays, and a porch with a moulded round arch, a moulded impost, pilasters, and an entablature, over which is a panel with an architrave and containing a coat of arms. To its right is a canted bay window with transomed lights, further to the right is a five-light mullioned and transomed window, and over theseis a continuous hood mould. The south front has four bays, an open porch with half-fluted columns and a pediment, and a doorway with a fanlight. The windows are tripartite with sashes.	II
Farm buildings, Home Farm; 53.54139°N 1.21942°W	—	Early 18th century	A group of combination farm buildings including cowhouses, shelter sheds, cartsheds, and barns, the oldest a barn that has been incorporated in larger 19th-century ranges. The buildings are in limestone with stone slate eaves courses and hipped pantile roofs. The later buildings have a single storey, and an E-shaped plan, enclosing two fold yards, and with a cartshed arcade on the east side. On the north side of each fold yard is an arcade of six segmental arches on cylindrical columns, and the cartshed has 14 arches. The earlier range has two storeys quoins, triangular vents, arched openings, windows, hatches, and external steps.	II
Outbuildings, Marr Hall; 53.54178°N 1.22088°W	—	Mid 18th century (probable)	The outbuildings contain stables, a dovecote, and a granary, and are in limestone with tile eaves courses and hipped pantile roofs. There are two rectangular buildings at right angles, linked by a later canopy. The building on the right has quoins, a sill band, a segmental-arched carriage entry with a keystone, a doorway with a fanlight, and casement windows. Above are loft openings and pigeon holes with ledges. The other building is similar, and has external steps.	II
Manor Farmhouse; 53.54064°N 1.22595°W	—	Early 19th century	The farmhouse is rendered, on a plinth, and has chamfered quoins, a floor band, and a hipped tile roof. There are two storeys, a double-depth plan, and three bays. On the front is a Tuscan porch with a pediment, and a doorway with a fanlight and an architrave. Flanking it are slightly bowed tripartite windows, and the windows in the upper floor are sashes.	II
Shelter shed, Manor Farm; 53.54105°N 1.22610°W		Early 19th century (probable)	The shed is in limestone and has a pantile roof. Much of it has been demolished, but an arcade remains. This consists of ten segmental arches on cylindrical columns with square capitals.	II
