= William Wheatcroft =

16th-century English politician

William Wheatcroft (by 1517 – 1558?), of Rendlesham and Ipswich, Suffolk, was an English politician.

He was a member of parliament (MP) for Ipswich in 1558.
