= Paul Le Mesurier =

English merchant and politician (1755–1805)

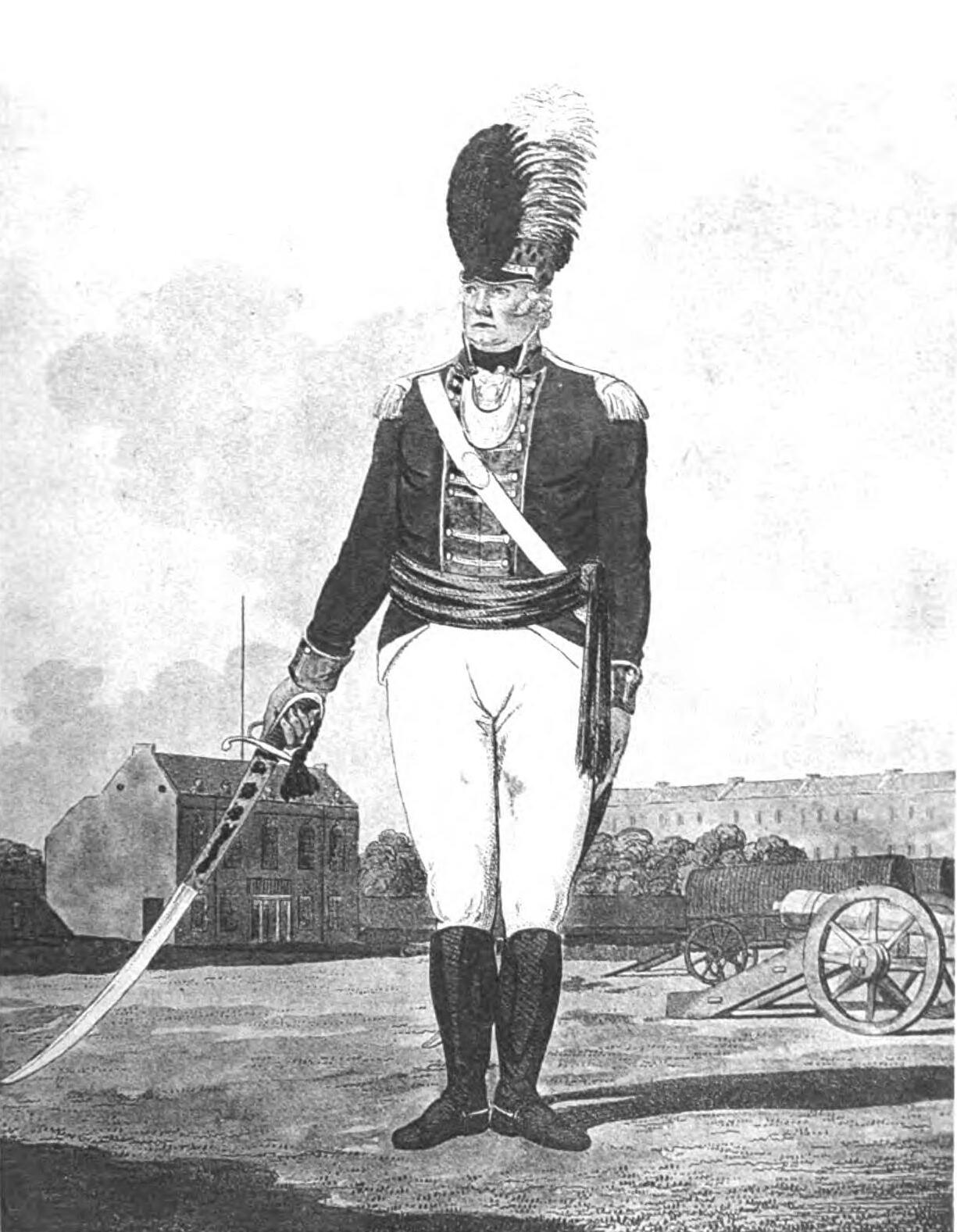
- Born: 23 February 1755
- Died: 9 December 1805 (aged 50)

Paul Le Mesurier (23 February 1755 – 9 December 1805) was a Guernsey-born merchant, ship-owner, director of the East India Company, a Member of Parliament, an Alderman of London, and the Lord Mayor of London (1793–94).

== Life and career ==
Le Mesurier was born the son of John Le Mesurier, the hereditary Governor of Alderney. In 1776 he went into partnership with his wife's uncle, Noah Le Cras, a London merchant. During the American War of Independence the firm had a very profitable business as prize agents. He was made an Alderman of the city in 1784 and served as Sheriff of London for 1786.

Le Mesurier was an insurance broker and underwriter at Lloyd's of London. He was a shipowner with at least one vessel that was involved in South Seas whaling.

In 1784, he was elected a director of the East India Company for the first time, and then re-elected in 1789, 1794, 1799 and 1804, each time serving for the conventional 3 years, except in the last case which was terminated by his death.

Le Mesurier was also elected in 1784 to represent Southwark in the British Parliament, retaining the seat until 1796. He was chosen in 1793 to serve as Lord Mayor of London for the following Mayoral year.

He was a Colonel in the Honourable Artillery Company from 1795 till hs death.

Le Mesurier died in 1805 at his home in Upper Homerton, Middlesex. He had married Margaret, the daughter of Isaac Roberdeau of Spitalfields, and had a son and 3 daughters.

== See also ==
- List of East India Company directors

Parliament of Great Britain
Preceded by Henry Thornton; Sir Barnard Turner	Member of Parliament for Southwark; 1784 – 1796; With: Henry Thornton	Succeeded by Henry Thornton; George Woodford Thellusson
