= Sandlings Forest =

Woodland in Suffolk, England

Coordinates: 52.11°N 1.45°E

- Site of Special Scientific Interest
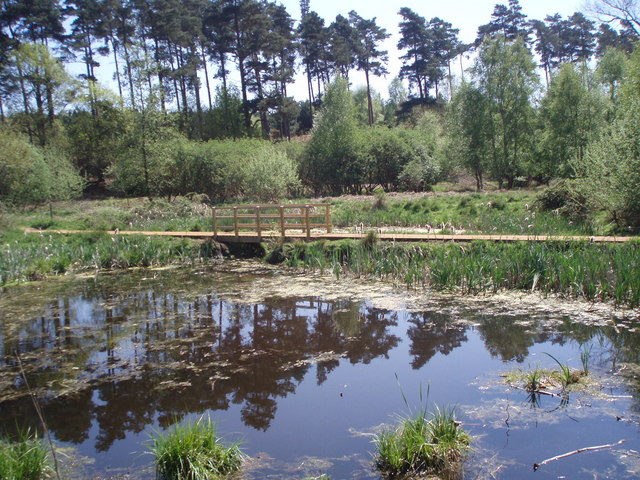
- Pond in Rendlesham Forest
- Location of Sandlings Forest.
- Area of search: Suffolk
- Grid reference: TM 363 512
- Interest: Biological
- Area: 2,483.8 hectares
- Notification date: 2000
- Location map: Magic Map

Sandlings Forest is a 2,483.8 hectare biological Site of Special Scientific Interest in two large blocks, Rendlesham Forest and Tunstall Forest, and two small ones, between Woodbridge and Aldeburgh in Suffolk. It is partly in the Sandlings Special Protection Area under the European Union Directive on the Conservation of Wild Birds. It is in the Suffolk Coast and Heaths Area of Outstanding Natural Beauty.

These commercial coniferous plantations are designated an SSSI for their internationally important bird populations. Surveys in the 1990s found 81 singing nightjars, around 2% of the number in Britain, and 71 woodlarks, approximately 5% of the British population.

There are public footpaths through the woods.

Most of the land within Sandlings Forest SSSI is owned by the Forestry Commission, although the Royal Society for the Protection of Birds also own some patches of land within this protected area. Suffolk Wildlife Trust has a management role for parts of this protected area and has restored habitats to bring greater connectivity.
