= Horatio Churchill =

English politician

Horatio Churchill (28 February 1759 – 22 September 1817), of Lower Grosvenor Street, Middlesex, was an English politician.

He was a younger son of Charles Churchill, MP.

He joined the Army as an ensign in 1773 and rose to the rank of Major-General in the Royal Artillery in 1811.

In parallel with his military career he was also a Member of Parliament (MP) of the Parliament of England for Castle Rising from 1796 to 1802.

He married Harriot Ann Modigham (or Modigliani) and had a son and two daughters.
