= HMS Rendlesham =

Minesweeper of the Royal Navy

History

United Kingdom
- Name: HMS Rendlesham
- Namesake: Rendlesham
- Builder: Brooke Marine
- Launched: 13 October 1954
- Completed: 25 February 1955
- Fate: Transferred to France, 1955

France
- Name: Aubepine
- Acquired: 1955
- Fate: Sold, 1974

General characteristics
- Class & type: Ham-class minesweeper
- Notes: Pennant number(s): M2724 / IMS61

HMS Rendlesham was a Ham-class minesweeper of the Royal Navy.

Their names were all chosen from villages ending in -ham. The minesweeper was named after Rendlesham in Suffolk.
