= Baron Rendlesham =

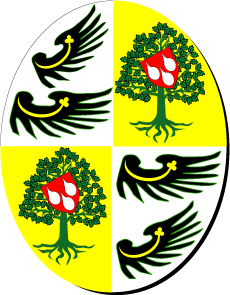
Coat of arms of the Lords Rendlesham.

Baron Rendlesham, of Rendlesham, is a title in the Peerage of Ireland. It was created in 1806 for the businessman Peter Thellusson, who also represented Midhurst, Malmesbury and Bossiney in Parliament. The Thellusson (pronounced "Tellusson") family were of French Protestant origin, but settled in Geneva, Switzerland, after the St. Bartholomew's Day massacre of 1572.

A later member of the family, Peter Thellusson, emigrated to England in 1762 where he established a successful London business. From the wealth acquired, he purchased several estates around the country, notably Brodsworth Hall in South Yorkshire. After his death his estate was embroiled in the Thellusson Will Case.

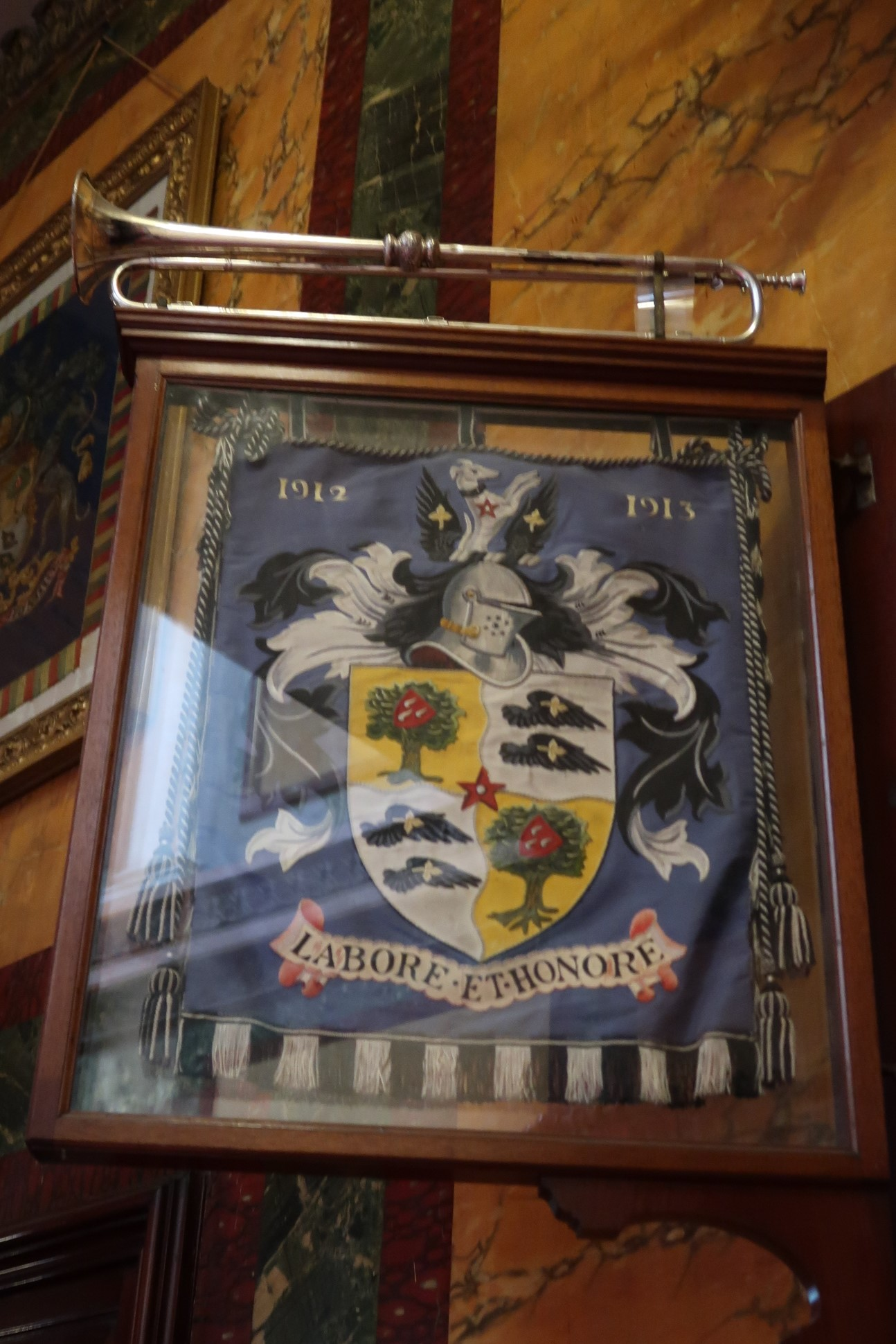
Rendlesham arms from Brodsworth Hall

His eldest son was the aforementioned Peter Isaac Thellusson, 1st Baron Rendlesham, who took over the family business. Lord Rendlesham's younger son, the fourth Baron (who succeeded his twin brother), sat as a Member of Parliament for Suffolk East. His only son, the fifth Baron, also represented this constituency (as a Conservative). As of 2013 the title is held by the latter's great-grandson, the ninth Baron, who succeeded his father in 1999.

== Baron Rendlesham (1806) ==
=== Line of succession ===
- Peter Isaac Thellusson, 1st Baron Rendlesham (1761–1808)
  - John Thellusson, 2nd Baron Rendlesham (1785–1832)
  - William Thellusson, 3rd Baron Rendlesham (1798–1839)
  - Frederick Thellusson, 4th Baron Rendlesham (1798–1852)
    - Frederick William Brook Thellusson, 5th Baron Rendlesham (1840–1911)
      - Frederick Archibald Charles Thellusson, 6th Baron Rendlesham (1868–1938)
      - Percy Edward Thellusson, 7th Baron Rendlesham (1874–1943)
      - Hon. Hugh Edmund Thellusson (1876–1926)
        - Charles Anthony Hugh Thellusson, 8th Baron Rendlesham (1915–1999)
          - Charles William Brooke Thellusson, 9th Baron Rendlesham (born 1954)
        - Hon. Peter Robert Thellusson (1920–2007)
          - (1) James Hugh Thellusson (born 1961)
            - (2) Benjamin Peter Thellusson (born 2002)
          - (3) Peter Richard Thellusson (born 1962)

The heir presumptive is present holder's first cousin, James Hugh Thellusson (born 1961).
The heir presumptive's heir apparent is his son, Benjamin Peter Thellusson (born 2002).
