= Charles Thellusson =

British politician (1770–1815)

Member of Parliament for Evesham
- In office 1796–1806 Serving with Thomas Thompson, Patrick Craufurd Bruce
- Preceded by: Thomas Thompson; John Rushout
- Succeeded by: William Manning; Humphrey Howorth

Personal details
- Born: 2 February 1770
- Died: 2 November 1815 (aged 45)
- Spouse: Sabine Robarts (m. 1795, died)
- Relations: Peter Thellusson, 1st Baron Rendlesham (brother); George Woodford Thellusson (brother)
- Children: 3
- Parent(s): Peter Thellusson; Anne Woodford
- Education: Harrow School

Charles Thellusson (2 February 1770 – 2 November 1815), was a British merchant, banker and politician.

== Early life ==
Charles Thellusson was born on 2 February 1770. He was the third son of Peter Thellusson, a wealthy London merchant, and his wife Ann Woodford, daughter of Matthew Woodford. Among his siblings were Peter Thellusson, 1st Baron Rendlesham, and George Woodford Thellusson, MP for Southwark, Tregony, and Barnstaple.

Like his elder brother, he was educated at Harrow School in 1785.

== Career ==
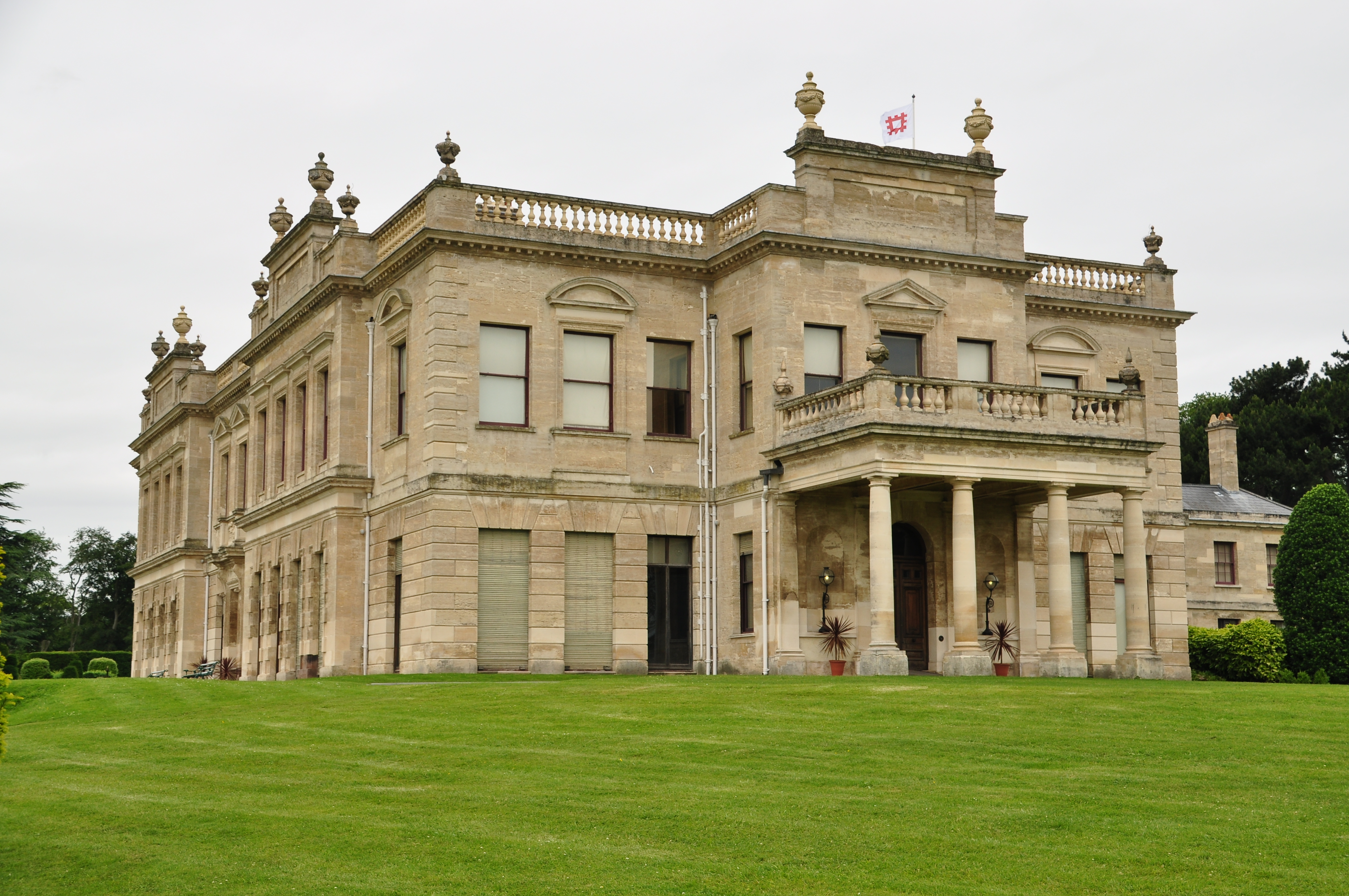
Brodsworth Hall

Like his brothers, Charles Thellusson joined his fathers London based merchant bank ″Peter Thellusson & Co.″ as a Partner and was a signatory to the London Merchants' Declaration of Loyalty to Pitt's government on 2 December 1795.

He became Member of Parliament for Evesham at the 1796 British general election and was re-elected in 1802.

== Personal life ==
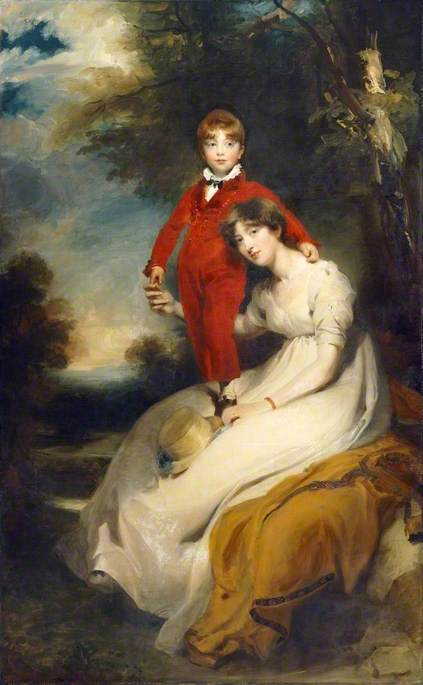
Portrait of his wife, Mrs Charles Thellusson (née Sabine Robarts), by Thomas Lawrence, c. 1805

On 15 January 1795, Thellusson married Sabine Robarts (1775–1814), the eldest daughter of Abraham Robarts, MP for Worcester. She was also the niece of George Tierney. Together, they were the parents of two sons and one daughter.

Thellusson died on 2 November 1815.

Parliament of Great Britain
Preceded by Thomas Thompson; John Rushout	Member of Parliament for Evesham; 1796–1806; With: Thomas Thompson (1796–1802); Patrick Craufurd Bruce (1802–1806)	Succeeded by William Manning; Humphrey Howorth
