= Rendlesham Forest =

Public recreational woodland in Suffolk, England

Coordinates: 52°5′2″N 1°25′58″E

Rendlesham Forest /ˈrɛndəlʃəm/ is a 1,500-hectare (3,700-acre) mixed woodland in Suffolk owned by Forestry England with recreation facilities for walkers, cyclists and campers.

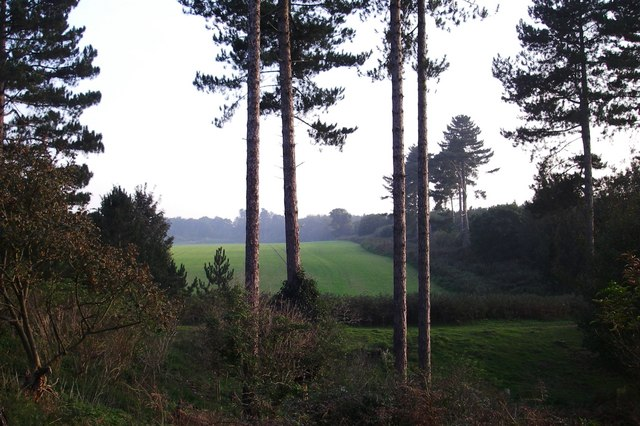

== Geography ==
The forest is in the parishes of Bromeswell in the west, Eyke, Capel St Andrew to the south, and Butley, Suffolk to the east. It is in the Suffolk Coastal district. It is part of the Sandlings Forest Site of Special Scientific Interest. A large area of the forest was cleared for the construction of RAF Woodbridge in 1943.

== See also ==
- Rendlesham Forest incident
