= Peter Thellusson =

British-Genevan businessman and banker

Peter [de] Thellusson (27 June 1735 — 21 July 1797) was a Genevan businessman and banker who settled in London, and became a British subject in 1762. He amassed a fortune through commerce and, when he died in 1797, he owned more than 4,000 acres of land in England. His descendants built the new Brodsworth Hall in South Yorkshire, which is maintained since 1988 by English Heritage.

== Early life ==
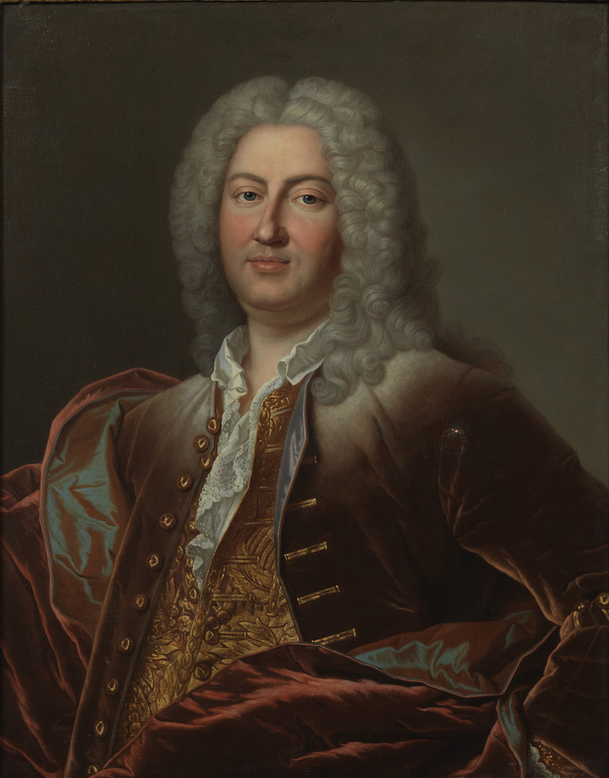
Portrait of Isaac de Thellusson, Peter Thellussons father, by Hyacinthe Rigaud, c. 1722

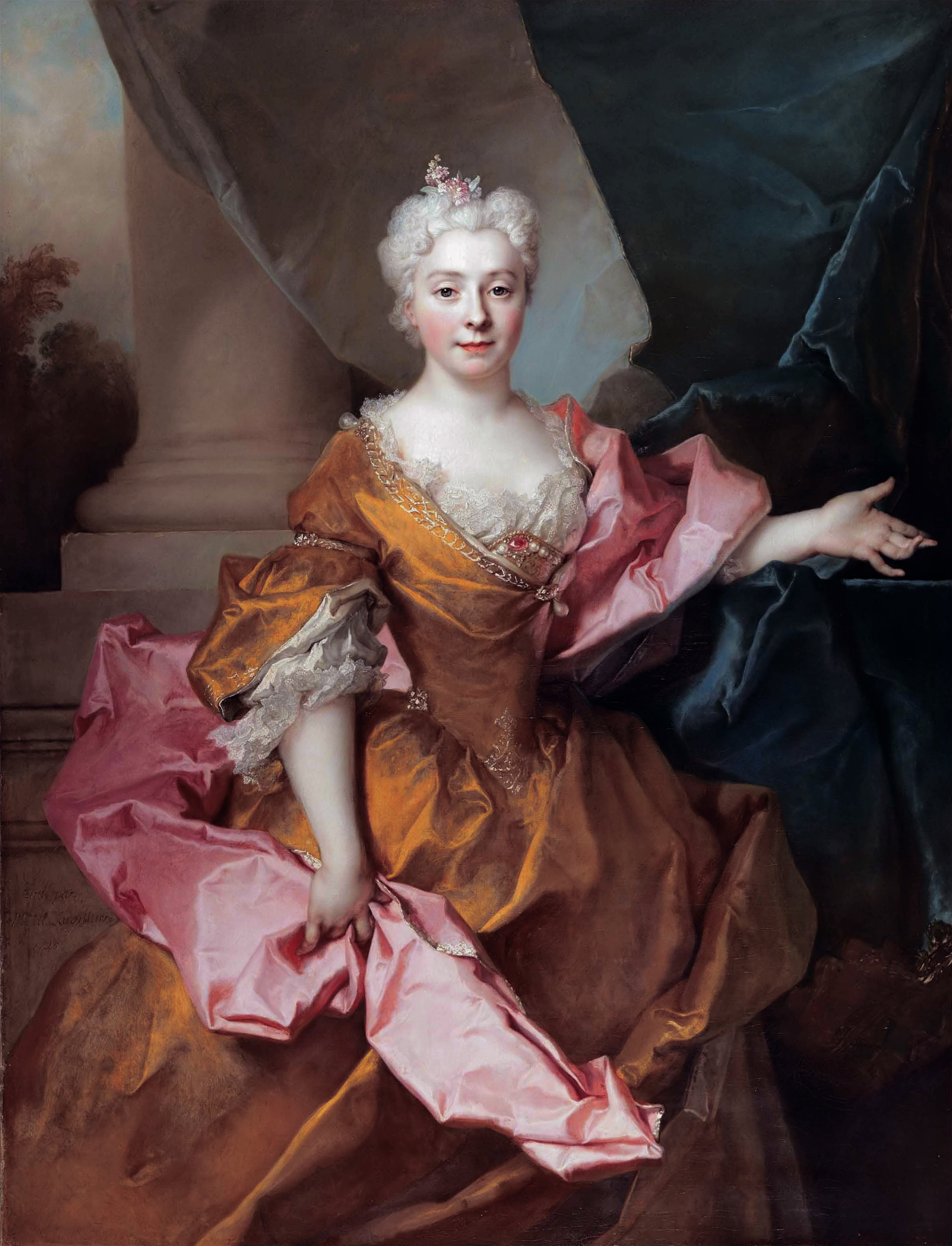
Portrait of his mother, Madame Isaac de Thellusson, by Nicolas de Largillière, 1725

Thellusson was a member of a Huguenot family which had fled France for Geneva in the 16th century. He was a son of Isaac de Thellusson (1690–1755) and Sarah (née le Boullenger) Thellusson (1700–1770). His father had started a bank in Paris with a branch in Geneva (Thellusson, Necker et Cie) and became the Genevan ambassador to Paris. The French-Genevan banker Georges-Tobie de Thellusson (1728–1776) was Peter Thellesson's older brother.

== Career ==
Peter, with the help of his brother George-Tobie, managed the successful bank in partnership with Jacques Necker, the Thellussons managing the London branch of the bank from 1760 with Necker managing the Paris branch. Both partners became very rich by loans to the treasury and speculation in grain. Peter started his own finance house in Philpot Lane and in 1761 took British nationality by Act of Parliament.

He was also involved in other businesses, becoming a director of the Bank of England, part owner of several sugar refineries, and an importer of tobacco and sugar from the West Indies. This role saw him provide loans to slave ship and plantation owners. As these slave owners defaulted on debts, Thellusson amassed interests in Caribbean plantations. The Thellussons continued to own slaves in Grenada and Montserrat until 1820. Thellusson built a large house for himself 'Plaistow Lodge' at Bromley in Kent (Now Bromley Parish CofE Primary School) and in 1790 bought the Brodsworth estate in South Yorkshire.

== Personal life ==
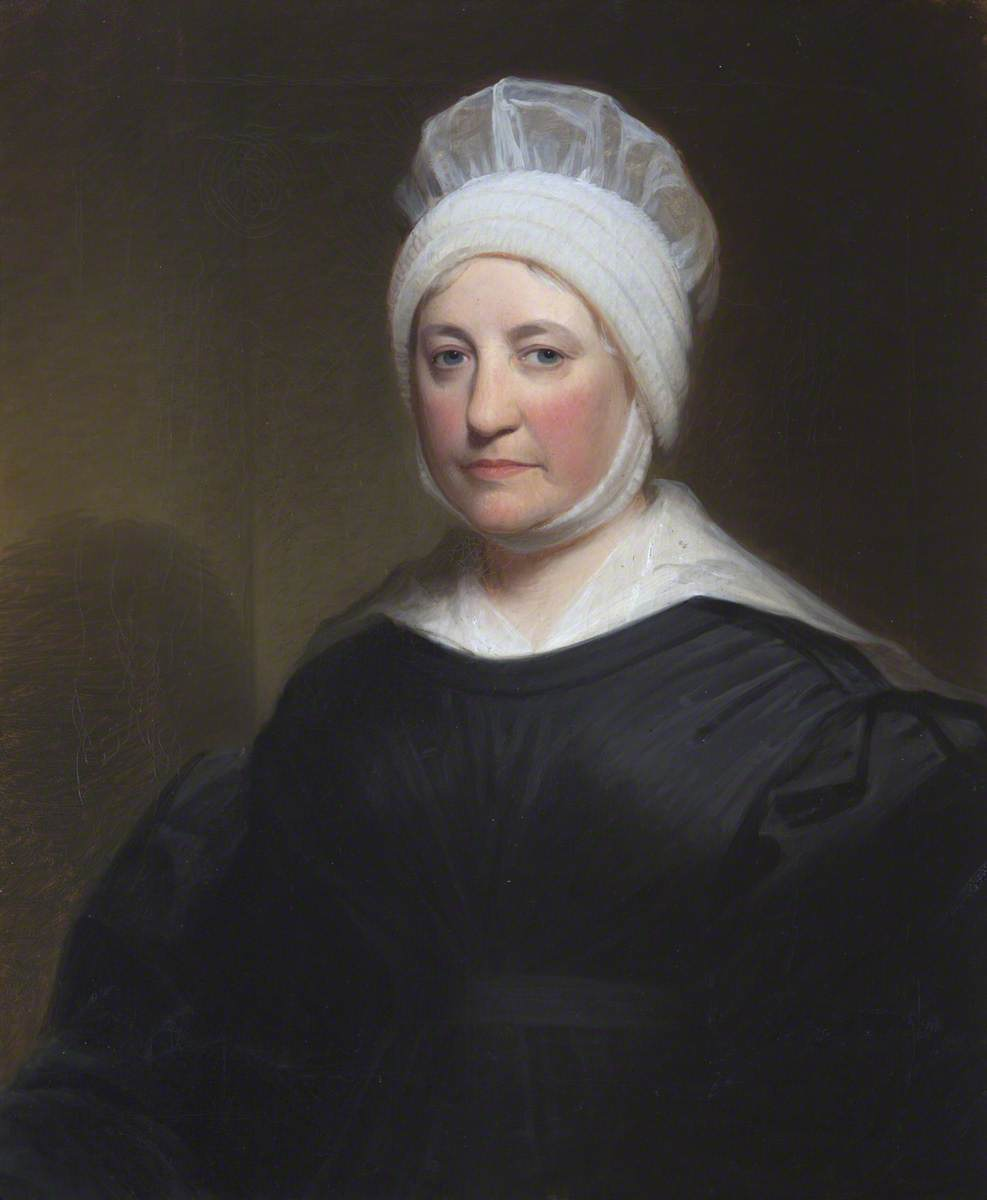
Portrait of his daughter, Anne, by William Edward West, 1833

On 6 January 1760 he married Ann Woodford (1740–1805), daughter of Matthew Woodford and sister of Sir Ralph Woodford of Carlby, Lincolnshire. They were the parents of:

- Peter Isaac Thellusson, 1st Baron Rendlesham (1761–1808), who married Elizabeth Eleanor Cornwall, a daughter of John Cornwall, in 1783.
- George Woodford Thellusson (1764–1811), who married Mary Anne Fonnereau, a daughter of Philip Fonnereau, MP for Aldeburgh, and Mary (née Parker) Fonnereau (a daughter of Armstead Parker, MP for Peterborough), in 1790.
- Maria Thellusson (1766–?), who married Hon. Augustus Phipps, son of Constantine Phipps, 1st Baron Mulgrave, and Hon. Lepell Hervey (daughter of John Hervey, 2nd Baron Hervey).
- Augusta Charlotte Thellusson (1768–?), who married Thomas Champion Crespigny, son of Philip Champion de Crespigny, in 1798. After his death, she married Sir Joseph Whatley in 1827.
- Charles Thellusson (1770–1815)), who married Sabine Robarts, daughter of Abraham Robarts, MP for Worcester, in 1795.
- Anne Thellusson (1774–1849), who married Vice-Admiral William Lukin, son of Very Rev. George William Lukin, in 1801.

== Death and estate ==
After his death his substantial estate was embroiled in the Thellusson Will Case, as he had written an unusual will, described as "one of the most spectacularly vindictive wills in British history", whereby his fortune and estates were put into a trust fund for the benefit of future generations at the expense of his children and grandchildren. The two ultimate beneficiaries, decided by the courts after protracted legal wrangling, were the grandchildren of his eldest son Peter Isaac Thelluson, who was created Baron Rendlesham in 1806 and one of his other sons, Charles. It is believed that the Thellusson Will case provided the basis for the fictional case of Jarndyce and Jarndyce in Charles Dickens' novel Bleak House. Thelluson may also be the inspiration for the Tellsons Bank mentioned in Dickens' A Tale of Two Cities. As a result of the case, legislation, commonly known as the Thellusson Act, was passed to prevent a recurrence of such problems in the future.
