= Brodsworth Hall =

Historic house museum in South Yorkshire, England

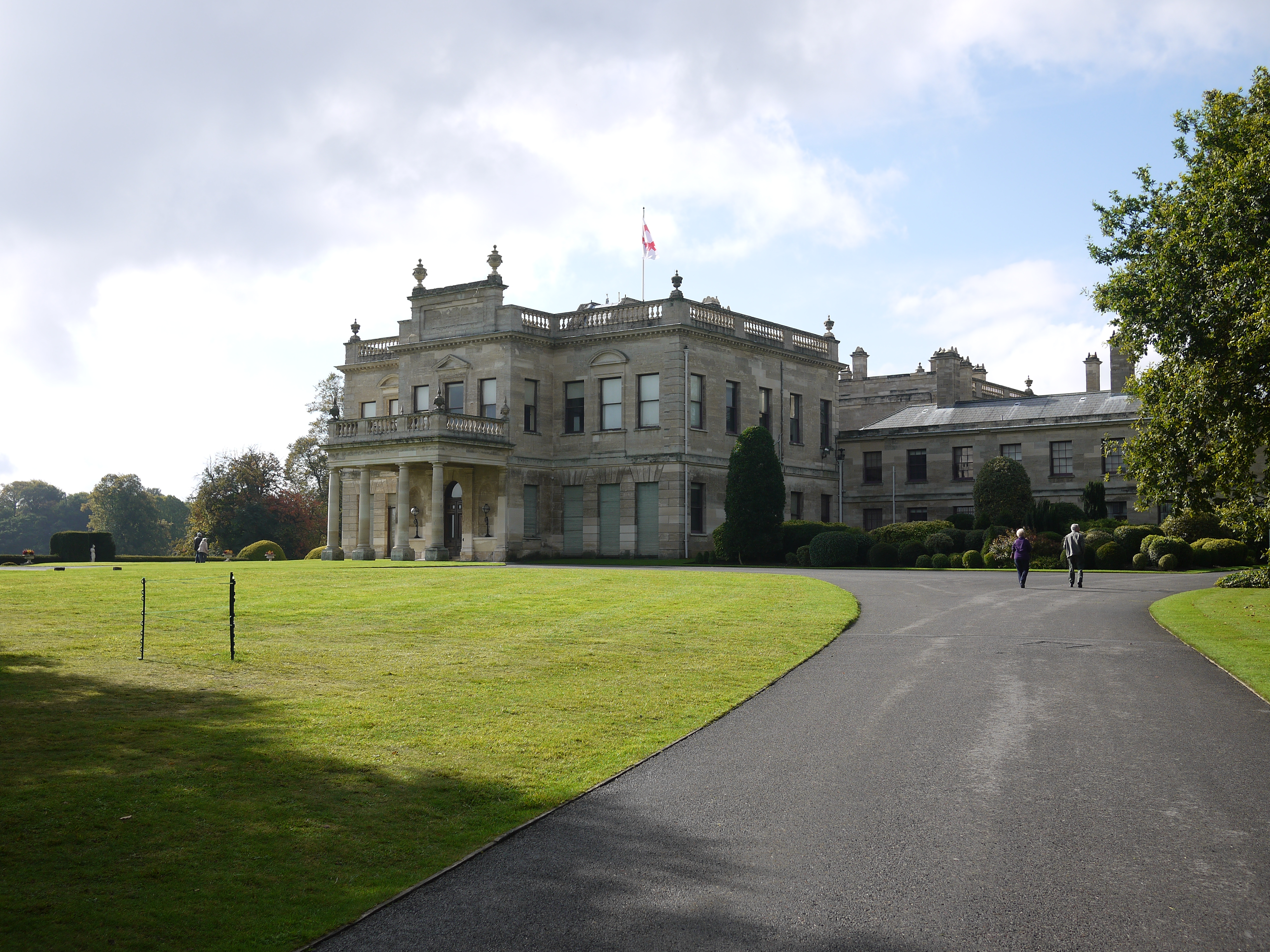

- Location within South Yorkshire
- 53°33′27″N 1°14′15″W
- Type: Country house
- Location: Brodsworth
- OS grid reference: SE 50595 07044

History
- Built: 1861–1863

Site notes
- Area: Doncaster
- Architect: Philip Wilkinson
- Architectural style: Italianate
- Owner: English Heritage

Listed Building – Grade I
- Official name: Brodsworth Hall
- Designated: 5 June 1968
- Reference no.: 1191614

Brodsworth Hall, near Brodsworth, 5 miles (8 km) north-west of Doncaster in South Yorkshire, is one of the most complete surviving examples of a Victorian country house in England. It is virtually unchanged since the 1860s. It was designed in the Italianate style by the obscure London architect, Philip Wilkinson, then 26 years old. He was commissioned by Charles Sabine Augustus Thellusson, who inherited the estate in 1859, but the original estate was constructed in 1791 for merchant and slave owner Peter Thellusson. It is a Grade I listed building.

== History ==
George Hay, 8th Earl of Kinnoull, bought the Brodsworth estate from Sir John Wentworth in 1713 and rebuilt the house in the Georgian style, but lost his money in the South Sea Bubble crash of 1720 and was obliged to take the position of Ambassador to the Ottoman Empire. His second son Robert, later Archbishop of York, took up residence on the estate instead and made a number of improvements to the house and grounds. On his death in 1777, the house was left empty, and, after his eldest son became the 10th Earl of Kinnoull in 1787, he sold the estate in 1790 to Peter Thellusson (1737–1797) of the Swiss banking family.

Peter Thellusson had come from Geneva and settled in England, becoming a director of the Bank of England. This role saw him provide loans to slave ship and plantation owners. As these slave owners defaulted on debts, Thellusson amassed interests in Caribbean plantations and became a tobacco and sugar importer. He wrote an unusual will, unsuccessfully challenged by his family in the Thellusson Will Case, whereby his fortune was put in trust to be untouched for three generations. Peter Thellusson's grandson Arthur Thellusson, married the daughter of another Antigua slave owner, Sir Christopher Bethell-Codrington. The Thellussons were slave owners in Grenada and Montserrat as late as 1820.

One of the two eventual beneficiaries was the 5th Baron Rendlesham. The other was Peter's great-grandson Charles Sabine Augustus Thellusson who, in 1859, inherited half the bequest plus the Brodsworth estate with its Georgian house. He demolished the existing house and commissioned the present one, which was built in two years between 1861 and 1863. A keen yachtsman, he also commissioned four yachts, the last two being, successively, the largest in the world. He was appointed High Sheriff of Yorkshire for 1866–1867. He and his wife Georgiana left four sons, all of whom died childless, and the house therefore passed to each son in turn. The third son, Charles Thellusson, leased the mineral rights to the Brodsworth Colliery Company and also rented them the land for the construction of Woodlands model village to accommodate the miners. In addition he paid for the construction of All Saints' Church (1913) for the village. He was also responsible for the introduction of electric light to the hall.

After the First World War, spiralling costs resulted in the owners closing off parts of the house. On the death of the youngest son, Augustus Thellusson, in 1931, the house passed to his nephew, Captain Charles Grant-Dalton (1882–1952). He was High Sheriff of Yorkshire for 1942–1943.

The last resident of the house was Sylvia Grant-Dalton (wife of Captain Grant-Dalton), who fought a losing battle for 57 years against leaking roofs on the mansion and land subsidence from nearby coal mining. After her death in 1988, Her daughter, Pamela Williams, gave the Hall and gardens to English Heritage in 1990. The contents of the house were purchased by the National Heritage Memorial Fund and transferred to the ownership of English Heritage. It was decided to conserve the interiors "as found" rather than replacing or restoring them. They demonstrate how a once opulent Victorian house grew "comfortably" old.

== The House ==
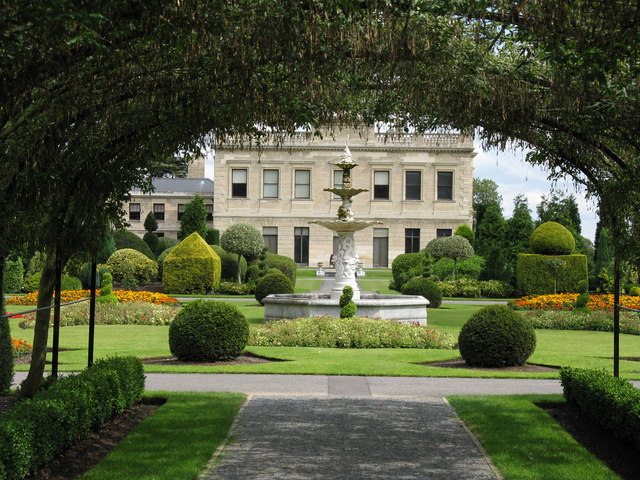
Brodsworth Hall and gardens

Designed in the Italianate style by Philip Wilkinson, the Hall is constructed in ashlar limestone, some quarried on the estate, with lead and slate roofs. Stonework, windows and interior fittings were reused from the older building. The building is T-shaped with the servants quarters forming the upright. The main block, forming the cross-bar, is 2-storey rectangular range having 9-bay frontage. The house has more than 30 rooms, ranging from grand reception rooms with original furnishings to the servants' quarters. The house is surrounded by Victorian period gardens, which are used for special events throughout the summer.

The house is noted for Charles Sabine Thellusson's collection of paintings and sculptures, including a large collection of Italian sculptures bought at the Dublin International Exhibition of 1865.

== See also ==
- Grade I listed buildings in South Yorkshire
- Listed buildings in Brodsworth
