= Thellusson v Woodford =

1799 United Kingdom law case

- Court: House of Lords
- Full case name: Peter Thellusson
- Decided: 1799
- Citation: (1799) 4 Ves 227, 338; 31 ER 117, 171; 38 ER 965 (1805) 11 Ves 112, 147; 32 ER 1030, 1044

Keywords
- Trust and Wills

Thellusson v Woodford (1799) 4 Ves 227 is an English trusts law case. It was a lawsuit resulting from the will of Peter Thellusson, an English merchant (1737–1797). The case involved prolonged litigation and was not fully resolved until the 1850s.

== Facts ==
Peter Thellusson directed the income of his property, consisting of real estate of the annual value of about £5,000 and personal estate amounting to over £600,000, to be accumulated during the lives of his children, grandchildren and great-grandchildren, living at the time of his death, and the survivor of them. The property so accumulated, which, it is estimated, would have amounted to over £14,000,000 (then an enormous sum), was to be divided among such descendants as might be alive on the death of the survivor of those lives during which the accumulation was to continue.

== Judgment ==
The bequest was held valid. In 1856, there was a protracted lawsuit as to who were the actual heirs. It was decided by the House of Lords (9 June 1859) in favour of Lord Rendlesham and Charles Sabine Augustus Thellusson. Owing, however, to the heavy expenses, the amount inherited was not much larger than that originally bequeathed.

== Significance ==
Accumulations Act 1800
- Act of Parliament
- Parliament of Great Britain
- Long title: An Act to restrain all Trusts and Directions in Deeds or Wills, whereby the Profits of Produce of Real or Personal Estate shall be accumulated, and the beneficial Enjoyment thereof postponed beyond the Time therein limited.
- Citation: 39 & 40 Geo. 3. c. 98
- Territorial extent: Great Britain

Dates
- Royal assent: 28 July 1800
- Commencement: 28 July 1800 (Note: The Acts of Parliament (Commencement) Act 1793.)
- Repealed: 1 January 1926
Other legislation
Amended by	Statute Law Revision Act 1888
Repealed by	Law of Property Act 1925

Status: Repealed

Text of statute as originally enacted

To prevent such a disposition of property in the future, the Accumulations Act 1800 (39 & 40 Geo. 3. c. 98), also as the Thellusson Act, was passed, by which it was enacted that no property should be accumulated for any longer term than either

1. the life of the grantor; or
2. the term of twenty-one years from his death; or
3. the minority of any person living or en ventre sa mere at the time of the death of the grantor; or
4. the minority of any person who, if of full age, would be entitled to the income directed to be accumulated.

The act, however, did not extend to any provision for payment of the debts of the grantor or of any other person, to any provision for raising portions for the children of the settlor, to any person interested under the settlement or any direction touching the produce of timber or wood upon any lands or tenements. The act was extended to heritable property in Scotland by the Entail Amendment Act 1848 but does not apply to property in Ireland.

The Act was further amended by the Accumulations Act 1892, which forbids accumulations for the purpose of the purchase of land for any longer period than during the minority of any person or persons who, if of full age, would be entitled to receive the income.

Following a 1998 report of the Law Commission, the rule against accumulations was abolished for England and Wales by section 13 of the Perpetuities and Accumulations Act 2009. (Section 14 of that Act made an exception for charitable trusts.) In Scotland, following a similar recommendation by the Scottish Law Commission, the rule against accumulations was abolished when section 45 of the Trusts and Succession (Scotland) Act 2024 came into force.

It is believed that the Thellusson Will case provided the basis for the fictional case of Jarndyce and Jarndyce in Charles Dickens' novel Bleak House.

== See also ==
- English trusts law
- Wellington R. Burt
- Jarndyce and Jarndyce

== Bibliography ==
- The Practice of the Commissary Courts in Scotland, 1859, William Alexander
- P Polden, Peter Thellusson's Will of 1797 and Its Consequences on Chancery Law (2002)
