= A Song for Simeon =

1928 poem by T.S. Eliot

- by T. S. Eliot
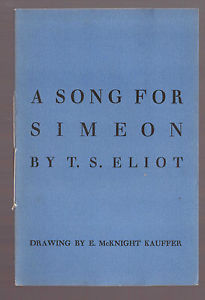
- The cover of the poem's first publishing, Faber and Gwyer's 1928 pamphlet
- Written: 1928
- First published in: Ariel Poems
- Illustrator: Edward McKnight Kauffer
- Form: Dramatic monologue
- Meter: Free verse
- Publisher: Faber and Gwyer
- Publication date: September 1928
- Lines: 37

"A Song for Simeon" is a 37-line poem written in 1928 by the American-English poet T. S. Eliot (1888–1965). It is one of five poems that Eliot contributed to the Ariel Poems series of 38 pamphlets by several authors published by Faber and Gwyer. "A Song for Simeon" was the sixteenth in the series and included an illustration by avant garde artist Edward McKnight Kauffer. The poems, including "A Song for Simeon", were later published in both the 1936 and 1963 editions of Eliot's collected poems.

In 1927, Eliot had converted to Anglo-Catholicism and his poetry, starting with the Ariel Poems (1927–31) and Ash Wednesday (1930), took on a decidedly religious character. "A Song for Simeon" is seen by many critics and scholars as a discussion of the conversion experience. In the poem, Eliot retells the story of Simeon from the second chapter of the Gospel of Luke, a just and devout Jew who encounters Mary, Joseph and the infant Jesus entering the Temple of Jerusalem. Promised by the Holy Ghost that he would not die until he had seen the Saviour, Simeon sees in the infant Jesus the Messiah promised by the Lord and asks God to permit him to "depart in peace" (Luke 2:25–35).

The poem's narrative echoes the text of the Nunc dimittis, a liturgical prayer for Compline from the Gospel passage. Eliot introduces literary allusions to earlier writers Lancelot Andrewes, Dante Alighieri and St. John of the Cross. Critics have debated whether Eliot's depiction of Simeon is a negative portrayal of a Jewish figure and evidence of antisemitism on Eliot's part.

== Writing and publication ==
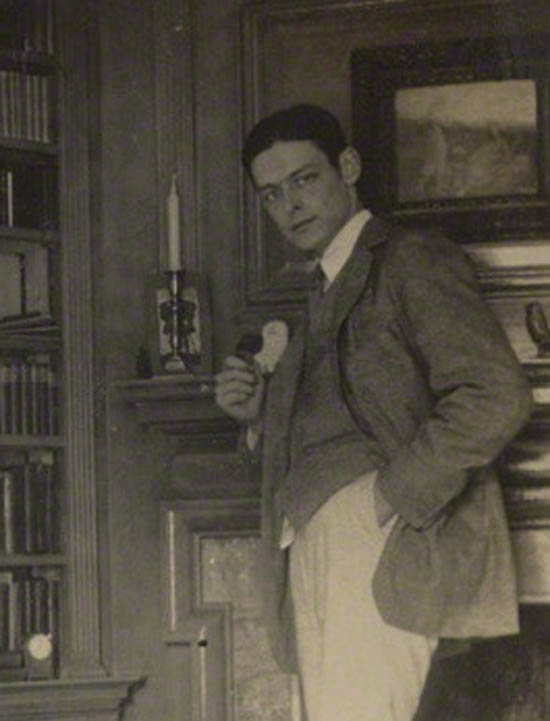
T. S. Eliot in 1920, in a photo taken by Lady Ottoline Morrell

In 1925, Eliot became a poetry editor at the London publishing firm of Faber and Gwyer, Ltd., after a career in banking, and subsequent to the success of his earlier poems, including "The Love Song of J. Alfred Prufrock" (1915), "Gerontion" (1920) and "The Waste Land" (1922). In these years, Eliot gravitated away from his Unitarian upbringing and began to embrace the Church of England. He was baptised into the Anglican faith on 29 June 1927 at Finstock, in Oxfordshire, and was confirmed the following day in the private chapel of Thomas Banks Strong, Bishop of Oxford. Eliot converted in private, but subsequently declared in his 1927 preface to a collection of essays titled For Lancelot Andrewes that he considered himself a classicist in literature, a royalist in politics, and an Anglo-Catholic in religion. When his conversion became known, it was "an understandable choice to those around him" given his intellectual convictions, and that "he could not have done anything less than seek what he regarded as the most ancient, most sacramental, and highest expression of the Christian faith that forms the indisputable basis for the culture and civilization of modern Europe". Eliot's conversion and his adherence to Anglo-Catholicism informed and influenced his later poetry.

Critical reviews of Eliot's poems shifted as well, with some critics asserting that Eliot's work suffered with the addition of Christian themes. One critic, Morton Zabel said that this "deprives his art of its once incomparable distinction in style and tone". Other critics thought Eliot's exploration of Christian themes was a positive development in his poetry, including Gordon Symes, who recognised it as "an evaluation of old age, an elucidation of its special grace, and an appreciation of its special function in the progress of the soul".

In 1927, Eliot was asked by his employer, Geoffrey Faber, to write one poem each year for a series of illustrated pamphlets with holiday themes to be sent to the firm's clients and business acquaintances as Christmas greetings. This series, called the "Ariel Series", consisted of 38 pamphlets published between 1927 and 1931 featuring poems and brief prose from a selection of English writers and poets. The first poem that Eliot wrote, "The Journey of the Magi", was printed as the eighth in the series in August 1927. For the second, "A Song for Simeon", Eliot turned to an event at the end of Nativity narrative in the Gospel of Luke. The printing of the poem, the sixteenth in the series, was completed on 24 September 1928. Eliot would follow these with three more poems: "Animula" in October 1929, "Marina" in September 1930, and "Triumphal March" in October 1931. Four of Eliot's five Ariel poems, including "A Song for Simeon", were accompanied by illustrations by American-born avant garde artist, E. McKnight Kauffer.

Faber and Gwyer printed "A Song for Simeon" in an 8½-inch × 5½-inch Demy Octavo (8vo) pamphlet in blue paper wraps with title in black ink. The poem was printed on two pages, accompanied by a colour image by Kauffer, and included one page of advertisements. Faber and Gwyer contracted with the Curwen Press in Plaistow to print 3,500 copies. The font of the cover and poem text was Walbaum, created by J. E. Walbaum of Goslar and Weimar in Germany in 1836. According to Gilmour, the edition was printed "in batches of eight".

In 1936, Faber and Faber, the successor firm to Faber and Gwyer, collected "A Song for Simeon" and three of the other poems under the heading "Ariel Poems" for an edition of Eliot's collected poems. ("Triumphal March" appears as Section 1 of "Coriolan" in the "Unfinished Poems" section.) When Faber released another series in 1954, Eliot included a sixth poem, "The Cultivation of Christmas Trees", which was added to Faber's 1963 edition of his collected poems. Both editions of collected poems were published in the United States by Harcourt, Brace & Company.

All six poems were published together as a separate publication for the first time by Faber & Faber in 2014. This publication included the original illustrations.

== Analysis ==
"A Song for Simeon" is a 37-line poem written in free verse. The poem does not have a consistent pattern of meter. The lines range in length from three syllables to fifteen syllables. Eliot uses end rhyme sporadically in 21 lines of the poem, specifically:

- and, hand, stand, and land (in lines 1, 3, 5, 7)
- poor and door (lines 10 and 12)
- sorrow and to-morrow (lines 20 and 24)
- derision and vision (lines 27 and 30)
- stair and prayer (lines 28 and 29)
- heart and depart (lines 32 and 36)

Eliot's use of lamentation, desolation and consolation—a repetition of the two-syllable -ation ending—is an example of syllable rhyme. Eliot employs forced rhyme (also called "oblique rhyme") on peace and ease (lines 8 and 11), and eye rhyme on home and come (lines 14 and 15).

"A Song for Simeon" is structured as a first-person dramatic monologue spoken by Simeon. Eliot's style of monologue used in the poem (and in many of his works) draws heavily from the influence of English Victorian poet Robert Browning (1812–1889). Literary scholar Martin Scofield directly identifies Simeon's recitation as "the voice of the Browningesque dramatic monologue" and characterises Eliot's use of Simeon as a speaker as a "mask that half hides and half reveals the poet".

== Themes and interpretation ==
=== Gospel narrative and the Nunc dimittis ===
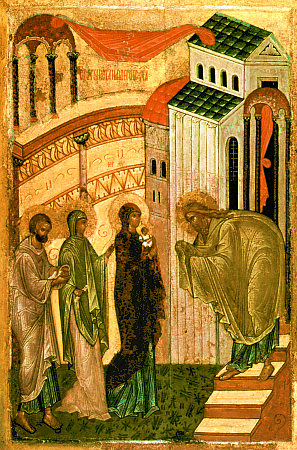
Сретение Господне ("The Meeting of the Lord"), a depiction of Simeon recognising Jesus at the Temple, from a 15th-century Novgorodskye School Russian icon

Most scholars and critics addressing the poem focus on the Gospel narrative for a source of interpretation as Eliot's poem quotes several lines verbatim from the passage in Luke, from the Nunc dimittis. Scofield says that the poem is "characterized by deliberately Biblical language, interwoven with actual phrases from the Gospels".

The subject of Eliot's poem is drawn from the second chapter of the Gospel of Luke (Luke 2:25–35), and the early Christian canticle Nunc dimittis derived from it. In Luke's account, Simeon, an aged and devout Jew, stands in the Temple of Jerusalem at the time Mary and Joseph bring the infant Jesus to be presented in the temple forty days after his birth in accordance with Jewish law and custom. Luke states that Simeon is "waiting for the consolation of Israel" after being promised that "he should not see death before he had seen the Lord's Christ". (Luke 2:25–26) Simeon, upon seeing the child, takes him into his arms and prays, prophesying the redemption of the world by Jesus and of suffering to come. This prayer would become known later as the Nunc dimittis, from its Latin incipit.

Lord, now lettest thou thy servant depart in peace : according to thy word.
For mine eyes have seen : thy salvation,
Which thou hast prepared : before the face of all people;
To be a light to lighten the Gentiles : and to be the glory of thy people Israel. (Luke 2:29–32)

The Nunc dimittis is the traditional "Gospel Canticle" of Night Prayer that is often called the Song of Simeon or Canticle of Simeon. In the Roman Catholic tradition, it was used during the Office for Compline, the last of the Canonical hours, in the Liturgy of the Hours. The Anglican tradition combined liturgy of the Catholic offices of Vespers (especially with the Magnificat canticle) and Compline (with the Nunc dimittis) into Evening Prayer when compiling the Book of Common Prayer during the English Reformation.

In 1886, Eliot's grandfather, William Greenleaf Eliot, an American educator and Unitarian minister, wrote a poem titled "Nunc dimittis". Written a few months before his death (and two years before T. S. Eliot's birth), the elder Eliot's poem used the same gospel text and the poet asks, in his decline, "When may I humbly claim that kind award, / And cares and labors cease?" "A Song for Simeon" has been seen by the Reverend Robin Griffith-Jones, an Anglican cleric, as a tacit tribute by Eliot to his grandfather, "for the last years of a grandfather whose faith his grandson has at last taken up for himself".

Scholars have identified allusions by Eliot to other biblical passages, including:

- "Before the stations of the mountain of desolation" in line 19 and the reference to "the fox's home" in line 15 as a reference to Calvary (Golgotha), or to Lamentations 5:17–18 "the mountain of zion ... is desolate, the foxes walk upon it". The fox reference is also thought to be connected to Mark 13:14, and Mark 8:20.
- The stations in line 19, and the time of cords, scourges and lamentation in line 17 refers to Christ's passion and crucifixion, in particular his scourging at the orders of Pontius Pilate and the lamenting of women along the Via Dolorosa described in Luke 33:27–29.
- "The goat's path" of line 15 is a reference to the scapegoat of Leviticus 16:22.
- "Fleeing from foreign faces and the foreign swords" is from prophesies of grief, hiding, and pursuit in Isaiah 51:3; and crucifixion events mentioned in Mark 13:8 and Matthew 24:8. Two scholars connect this to Ezekiel's prophesy of "death by the hands of strangers".
- The influence of Psalm 104 on the language of the poem.

=== Conversion ===
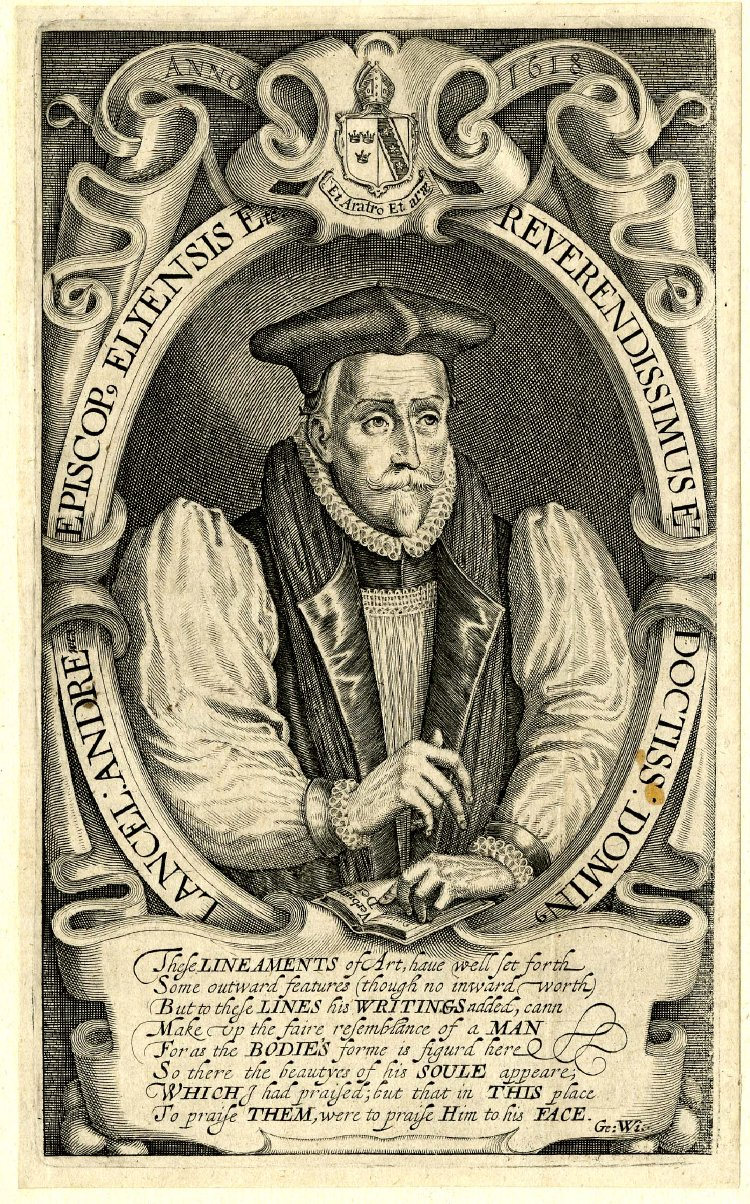
Eliot was influenced by an Ash Wednesday sermon (1619) of Anglican divine Lancelot Andrewes (pictured) that emphasised conversion as an act of turning toward God.

Scholars and critics do not consider "A Song for Simeon" to be one of Eliot's significant poems. It is thus overshadowed by his comparatively better-known works of the period—"The Hollow Men" (1925), written before his conversion; and "The Journey of the Magi" (1927), Ash Wednesday (1930), and the later, more substantial Four Quartets (1943), written after his conversion. However, in "A Song for Simeon" and these poems, Eliot continues the progression of his themes of alienation in a changing world, and fuses with this the tenets of his newfound faith. Scofield states that the imagery of "A Song for Simeon"—including the symbol of a feather, its setting amid Roman hyacinths and the winter sun—conveys "a sense of wonder and fragile new life". Robin Griffith-Jones draws a connection between Eliot's image of the feather to a statement by Hildegard of Bingen comparing herself "to 'a feather which lacks all weight and strength and flies through the wind'; so she was borne up by God. But Eliot's speaker, still waiting for the wind to blow, imagines only the death wind that will bear him away".

According to writer Joseph Maddrey, "A Song for Simeon" shares themes with his more famous conversion poem Ash Wednesday, the first parts of which Eliot was writing when "A Song for Simeon" was written and published. Eliot uses the biblical story of Simeon to illustrate the "contrast between appearance and reality and humbly begs God to teach him the stillness that unifies the two". Eliot's Ariel Poems and Ash Wednesday explore this new experience of conversion and the progress of the soul. Scofield writes that Eliot's depiction of Simeon presents "a figure to whom revelation has been granted but to whom it has come too late for this life". But as he awaits the death for which he asks, Simeon sees the consequences of the turning of faith to this new child and his mission. Simeon wants nothing of this "time of sorrow" and that the fate of persecution for the consequences of faith is not for him.

According to thy word.
They shall praise Thee and suffer in every generation
With glory and derision,
Light upon light, mounting the saints' stair.
Not for me the martyrdom, the ecstasy of thought and prayer,
Not for me the ultimate vision.

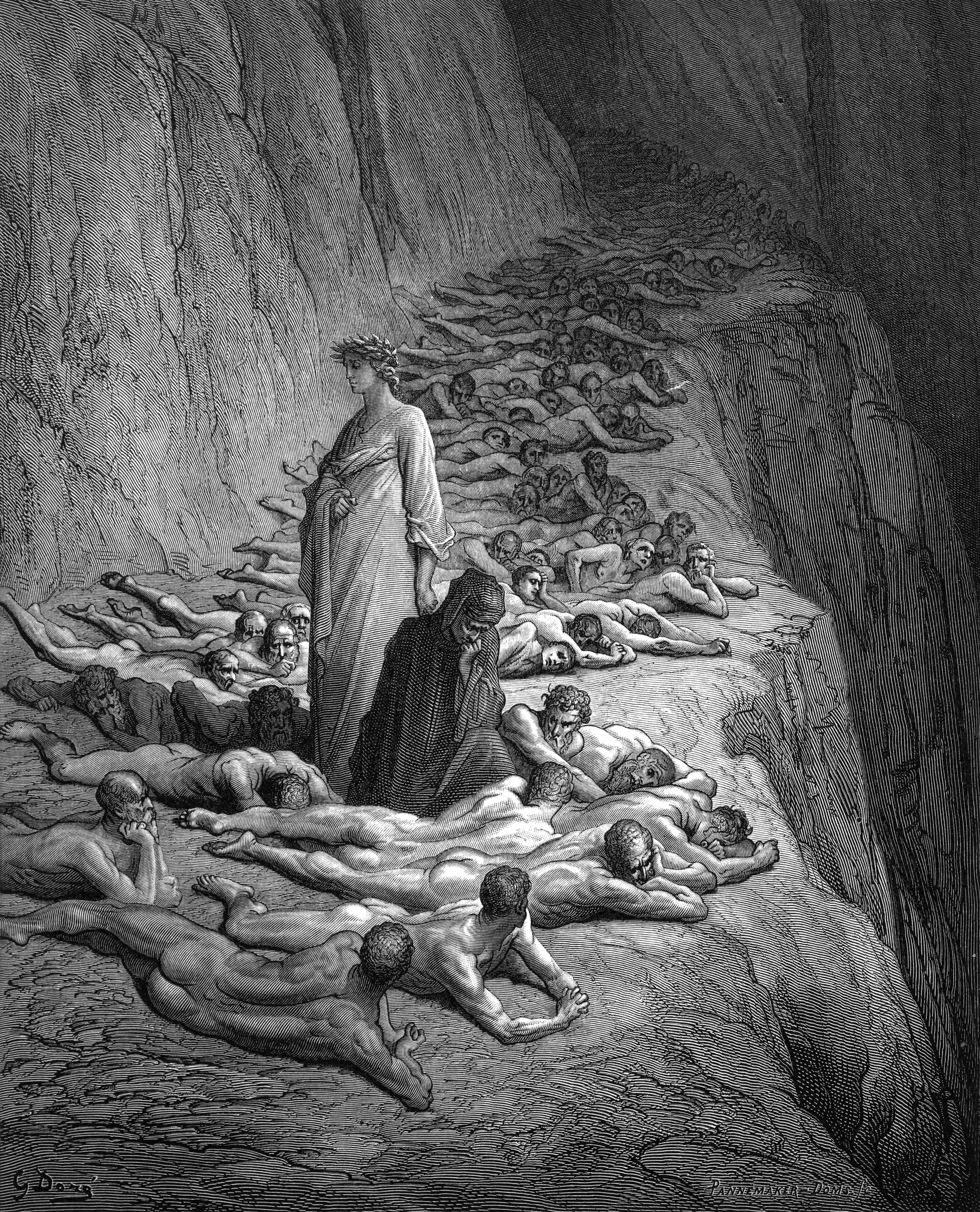
As Dante and Virgil journey through Purgatory, they encounter the souls of the avaricious and prodigal lying face down in the dust on the fifth terrace. (From an engraving by Gustave Doré).

According to Eliot biographer Lyndall Gordon, in Ash Wednesday and the Ariel Poems, "Eliot wonders if he does not belong to those who espouse Christianity officially without being properly committed, whose ostentatious piety is 'tainted with a self-conceit.'" The poem is inherently tied to Eliot's religious conversion experience, and connected to Eliot's reading of Anglican divine Lancelot Andrewes during this time. Andrewes, in a 1619 Ash Wednesday sermon, emphasised that conversion "must come from both mind and heart, thought and feeling, 'the principall [sic] and most proper act of a true turning to God.'" Andrewes' words are channelled again, when Eliot's Simeon "sees a faith that he cannot inhabit in "the still unspeaking and unspoken Word'". Eliot uses the image of the winding staircase—an image that also appears in Ash Wednesday—which Gordon indicates is a direct reference to Andrewes' sermon. According to Gordon, "Eliot's penitent ... 'turning on the winding stair', acts out the two mental turns Andrewes prescribed for a conversion: a turn that looks forward to God and a turn that looks backward to one’s sins, sentencing oneself for the past".

The image of a winding stair has also been tied to scenes in Dante's journey from Purgatory to Paradise in the Divine Comedy. Further, the image is thought associated with stairs as the path of mystical ascent in the writings of the 16th-century Spanish mystic Saint John of the Cross. Eliot often alludes to this symbol in several of his poems.

Eliot's Simeon appears similar to Dante's depiction of Virgil in the Divine Comedy, as "the seer who can see only so far; the precursor who cannot enter the world that he makes possible". Virgil, in the Divine Comedy, leads Dante through Hell (Inferno) and Purgatory (Purgatorio), but cannot guide him into Paradise (Paradiso). In this context, Virgil was a symbol of non-Christian philosophy and humanities could not help Dante any further in his approach to God. In Eliot's depiction, Simeon will never know the Christian culture he prophesizes, sensing "the birth-pangs of a world that he will never occupy".

=== Arguments over antisemitism ===
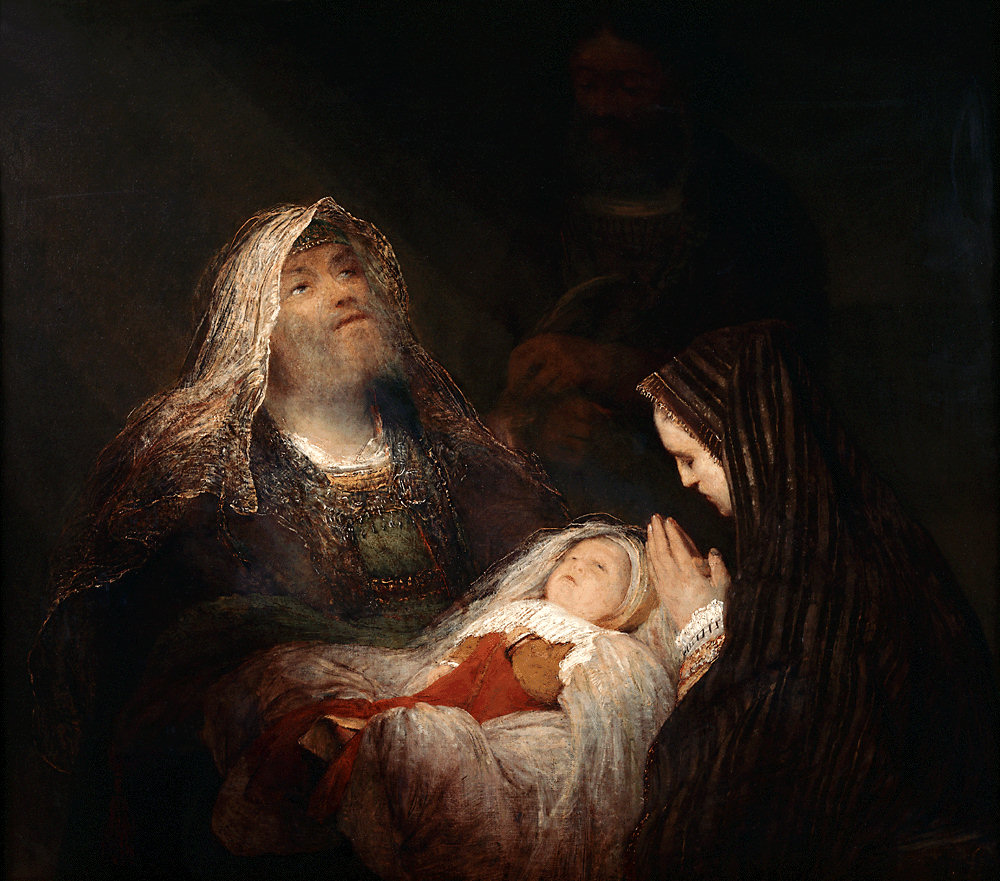
Aert de Gelder's early-18th-century painting Het loflied van Simeon (Simeon's song of praise)

Eliot's poems have frequently been examined for instances of antisemitism—prejudice or discrimination against Jews. Scholar Louis Menand states that while Simeon is treated respectfully by Eliot, his characterisation is "in the tradition of Christian condescension toward the virtuous heathen". Comparatively, Craig Raine, a poet and an Emeritus Fellow of New College, Oxford, wrote a book-length defence of Eliot against the claims of deliberate anti-Semitism and argues that "A Song for Simeon" provides a sympathetic discussion of the Jewish diaspora. University of British Columbia scholar John Xiros Cooper states that the accusations of antisemitism lodged against Eliot rest "on a few isolated lines of poetry" and a passing reference in one prose text. Indeed, Eliot denied the claim, declaring, "I am not an anti-Semite and never have been. It is a terrible slander on a man." Political theorist and author Leonard Woolf, who was both Jewish and one of Eliot's close friends, believed that Eliot was "slightly anti-Semitic in the sort of vague way which is not uncommon. He would have denied it genuinely."

Anthony Julius, a British lawyer who is one of Eliot's most trenchant critics on this issue, writes that "A Song for Simeon" is "exceptional in a poetry in which elsewhere Jews are dumb. The voice, however is a disciplined one and speaks lines prepared for it ... . The song is for, not of Simeon. Eliot gives the Jew lines that locate him, and by implication all Jews, wholly within the Christian drama. Incapable of denying its truth, but equally incapable of living that truth." He accuses Eliot of animating "the topoi of the Jew acknowledging his obsolescence"—essentially employing a tired characterisation of a Jewish figure as a voice attesting that Jews have no role in the Christian future. Julius compares Simeon to Moses stating that he is "fated to see the Promised Land but not to enter it ... witness to its truth, but denied its redemptive power, the Jew stands solemnly, humbly, outside Christianity's gates". Further, Julius draws on a quote from Eliot's earlier poem "Gerontion" to say that in this Christian future the Jews "may find a ledge there to squat on".

Julius' view is considered extreme by many critics. Comparatively, Julius tempered his harsh criticism by claiming that Eliot's antisemitism does not detract from the poetry and that it offers a creative force showing rare imaginative power to Eliot's art. Literary critic and professor Christopher Ricks agreed, citing the wit and commentary of Eliot's depictions of Jews; he asserts that Eliot was at his most brilliant in his prejudice.

== See also ==
- Presentation of Jesus at the Temple, also known as "Candlemas"
- T. S. Eliot bibliography
