= Journey of the Magi =

1927 poem by T. S. Eliot

- by T. S. Eliot
- The cover of the poem's first publication, Faber & Gwyer's 1927 pamphlet
- Written: 1927
- First published in: Ariel poems
- Illustrator: Edward McKnight Kauffer
- Form: Dramatic monologue
- Meter: Free verse
- Publisher: Faber and Gwyer
- Publication date: August 1927
- Lines: 43

"Journey of the Magi" is a 43-line poem written in 1927 by T. S. Eliot (1888–1965). It is one of five poems that Eliot contributed for a series of 38 pamphlets by several authors collectively titled the Ariel Poems and released by the British publishing house Faber and Gwyer (later Faber and Faber). Published in August 1927, "Journey of the Magi" was the eighth in the series and was accompanied by illustrations drawn by American-born avant garde artist Edward McKnight Kauffer (1890–1954). The poems, including "Journey of the Magi", were later published in both editions of Eliot's collected poems in 1936 and 1963.

In the previous year, Eliot had converted to Anglo-Catholicism and his poetry, starting with the Ariel Poems (1927–1931) and Ash Wednesday (1930), took on a decidedly religious character. In the poem, Eliot retells the story of the biblical Magi who travelled to Bethlehem to visit the newborn Jesus according to the Gospel of Matthew. It is a narrative, told from the point of view of one of the magi, that expresses themes of alienation, regret and a feeling of powerlessness in a world that has changed. The poem's dramatic monologue incorporates quotations and literary allusions to works by earlier writers Lancelot Andrewes and Matthew Arnold.

Journey of the Magi

A cold coming we had of it,
Just the worst time of the year
For a journey, and such a long journey:
The ways deep and the weather sharp,
The very dead of winter.’
And the camels galled, sore-footed, refractory,
Lying down in the melting snow.
There were times we regretted
The summer palaces on slopes, the terraces,
And the silken girls bringing sherbet.
Then the camel men cursing and grumbling
And running away, and wanting their liquor and women,
And the night-fires going out, and the lack of shelters,
And the cities hostile and the towns unfriendly
And the villages dirty and charging high prices:
A hard time we had of it.
At the end we preferred to travel all night,
Sleeping in snatches,
With the voices singing in our ears, saying
That this was all folly.

Then at dawn we came down to a temperate valley,
Wet, below the snow line, smelling of vegetation;
With a running stream and a water-mill beating the darkness,
And three trees on the low sky,
And an old white horse galloped away in the meadow.
Then we came to a tavern with vine-leaves over the lintel,
Six hands at an open door dicing for pieces of silver,
And feet kicking the empty wine-skins,
But there was no information, and so we continued
And arrived at evening, not a moment too soon
Finding the place; it was (you may say) satisfactory.

All this was a long time ago, I remember,
And I would do it again, but set down
This set down
This: were we led all that way for
Birth or Death? There was a Birth, certainly,
We had evidence and no doubt. I had seen birth and death,
But had thought they were different; this Birth was
Hard and bitter agony for us, like Death, our death.
We returned to our places, these Kingdoms,
But no longer at ease here, in the old dispensation,
With an alien people clutching their gods.
I should be glad of another death.

== Writing and publication ==
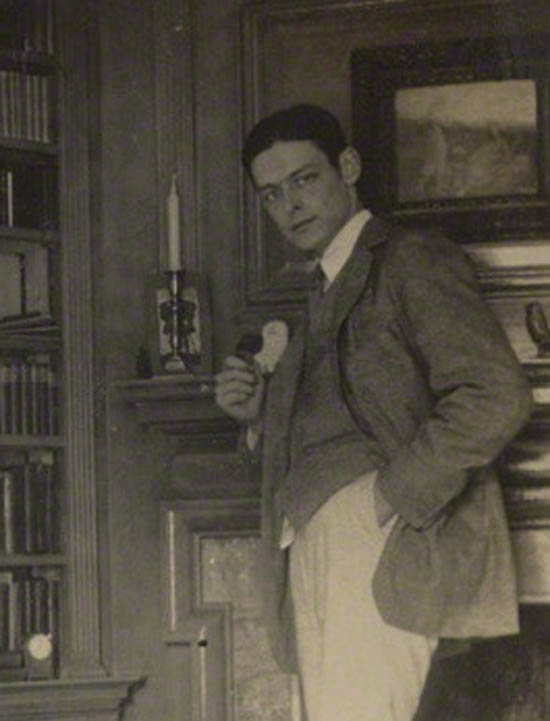
T. S. Eliot in 1920, in a photo taken by Lady Ottoline Morrell

In 1925, Eliot became a poetry editor at the London publishing firm of Faber and Gwyer, Ltd., after a career in banking, and subsequent to the success of his earlier poems, including "The Love Song of J. Alfred Prufrock" (1915), "Gerontion" (1920) and "The Waste Land" (1922). In these years, Eliot gravitated away from his Unitarian upbringing and began to embrace the Church of England. He was baptised into the Anglican faith on 29 June 1927 at Finstock, in Oxfordshire, and was confirmed the following day in the private chapel of Thomas Banks Strong, Bishop of Oxford. Eliot converted in private, but subsequently declared in his 1927 preface to a collection of essays titled For Lancelot Andrewes that he considered himself a classicist in literature, a royalist in politics, and an Anglo-Catholic in religion. When his conversion became known, it was "an understandable choice to those around him" given his intellectual convictions, and that "he could not have done anything less than seek what he regarded as the most ancient, most sacramental, and highest expression of the Christian faith that forms the indisputable basis for the culture and civilization of modern Europe". Eliot's conversion and his adherence to Anglo-Catholicism informed and influenced his later poetry.

Critical reviews of Eliot's poems shifted as well, with some critics asserting that Eliot's work suffered with the addition of Christian themes. One critic, Morton D. Zabel said that this "deprived his art of its once incomparable distinction in style and tone". Other critics thought Eliot's exploration of Christian themes was a positive development in his poetry, including Gordon Symes, who recognised it as "an evaluation of old age, an elucidation of its special grace, and an appreciation of its special function in the progress of the soul".

In 1927, Eliot was asked by his employer, Geoffrey Faber, one of the partners in Faber & Gwyer, to write one poem each year for a series of illustrated pamphlets with holiday themes to be sent to the firm's clients and business acquaintances as Christmas greetings. This series, called the "Ariel Series", would release 38 pamphlets from a selection of English writers and poets from 1927 through 1931. The first poem that Eliot wrote, "Journey of the Magi", was released as the eighth in the series in August 1927. Eliot would follow with four more poems: "A Song for Simeon" in August 1928, "Animula" in October 1929, "Marina" in September 1930, and "Triumphal March" in October 1931. Four of Eliot's five Ariel poems, including "Journey of the Magi", were accompanied by illustrations by American-born avant garde artist, E. McKnight Kauffer.

Faber & Gwyer, Ltd., printed the "Journey of the Magi" in a 7¼" × 4 ¾", Octavo (8vo) pamphlet "line block in black with brown and grey; casing, thin card covered with yellow laid paper." The font of the cover and poem text was "Imprint" created by Gerard Meynell & J. H. Mason in 1913 for the printing trade magazine The Imprint. The poem was printed on two pages, accompanied a colour images by Kauffer, and included one page of advertisements. Faber & Gwyer contracted with the Curwen Press in Plaistow to print 5,000 copies. There was a limited edition of 350 copies that was printed "on Zanders' hand-made paper". According to Gilmour, the edition was printed "in batches of eight." A yellow cover was used for Eliot's poem after Curwen's designer Paul Nash objected for its use in the seventh Ariel pamphlet, Siegfried Sassoon's "Nativity".

In 1936, Faber & Faber, the successor firm to Faber & Gwyer, collected "Journey of the Magi" and three of the other poems under the heading "Ariel Poems" for an edition of Eliot's collected poems. ("Triumphal March" appears as Section 1 of "Coriolan" in the "Unfinished Poems" section.) When Faber released another series in 1954, Eliot included a sixth poem, "The Cultivation of Christmas Trees", illustrated by artist and poet David Jones, which was added to Faber's 1963 edition of his collected poems. Both editions of collected poems were published in the United States by Harcourt, Brace & Company.

All six poems were published together as a separate publication for the first time by Faber & Faber in 2014. This publication included the original illustrations.

== Interpretation and analysis ==
The poem is an account of the journey from the point of view of one of the biblical Magi. The events are narrated in the first person, by an eyewitness with experience of the tale. The poem picks up Eliot's consistent theme of alienation, regret and a feeling of powerlessness in a world that has changed. In this regard, with a speaker who laments outliving his world, the poem recalls Arnold's Dover Beach, as well as a number of Eliot's own works. Instead of a celebration of the wonders of the journey, the poem is largely a complaint about a journey that was painful and tedious. It begins with five lines adapted from a passage in the "Nativity Sermon" preached by Lancelot Andrewes, the Bishop of Winchester, before James I on Christmas Day 1622. Andrewes' original text reads "A cold coming they had of it at this time of the year, just the worst time of the year to take a journey, and specially a long journey. The ways deep, the weather sharp, the days short, the sun farthest off, in solsitio brumali, the very dead of winter." This opening recollection by the magus sets off the reflections which follow. The speaker says that a voice was always whispering in their ears as they went that "this was all folly". The magus seems generally unimpressed by the infant, and yet realizes that the Incarnation has changed everything. He asks,

". . . were we led all that way for
Birth or Death?"

The birth of Christ was the death of the world of magic, astrology, and paganism (cf Colossians 2:20). The speaker, recalling his journey in old age, suggests that after that birth his world had died, and he had little to do but wait for his own death.

The poem maintains Eliot's long habit of using the dramatic monologue – a form he inherited and adapted from Robert Browning. The speaker of the poem is in agitation and speaks to the reader directly. His revelations are accidental and born out of his emotional distress. As with other works, Eliot chooses an elderly speaker – someone who is world-weary, reflective, and sad (cf. The Love Song of J. Alfred Prufrock, Gerontion, the Tiresias narrator of The Waste Land, and possibly the narrator of The Hollow Men). His narrator in this poem is a witness to historical change who seeks to rise above his historical moment, a man who, despite material wealth and prestige, has lost his spiritual bearings.

The poem has a number of symbolist elements, where an entire philosophical position is summed up by the manifestation of a single image. For example, the narrator says that on the journey they saw "three trees against a low sky"; the image suggesting the historical and spiritual future of the crucifixion (the skies lowered and heaven opened).

== See also ==
- List of Christmas-themed literature
