= T. S. Eliot bibliography =

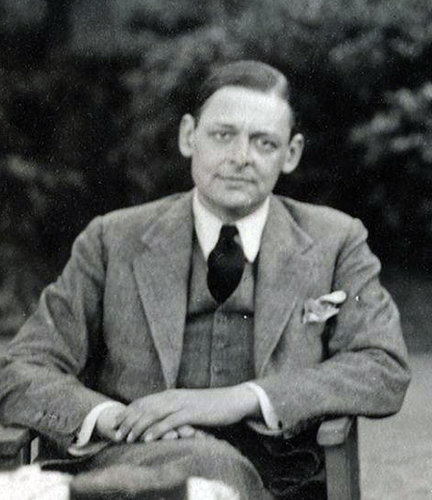
- Poetry↙: 26
- Plays↙: 9
- Fiction↙: 1
- Non-fiction↙: 45
- Letters↙: 8

The T. S. Eliot bibliography contains a list of works by T. S. Eliot.

== Poetry ==
The following is a list of books of poetry by T. S. Eliot arranged chronologically by first edition. (Note: Many of the books first published by Faber in London were published the following year by Harcourt, Brace in New York.) Some of Eliot's poems were first published in booklet or pamphlet format (such as his Ariel poems.)

- Prufrock and Other Observations. London: Egoist. 1917.
- Poems. Richmond, Surrey: The Hogarth Press. 1919.
- Ara Vos Prec. London: Ovid Press. 1920.
- Poems. New York: Knopf. 1920.
- The Waste Land. New York: Boni & Liveright. 1922.
- Poems 1909–1925. London: Faber & Gwyer. 1925.
- Journey of the Magi. London: Faber & Gwyer. 1927.
- A Song for Simeon. London: Faber & Gwyer. 1928.
- Animula. London: Faber. 1929.
- Ash-Wednesday. New York: Fountain Press. 1930.
- Marina. London: Faber. 1930.
- Triumphal March. London: Faber. 1931.
- Words for Music. Bryn Mawr, PA: Privately printed. 1934.
- Collected Poems 1909–1935. London: Faber. 1936.
- Old Possum's Book of Practical Cats. London: Faber. 1939.
- East Coker. London: Faber. 1940.
- Burnt Norton. London: Faber. 1941.
- The Dry Salvages. London: Faber. 1941.
- Little Gidding. London: Faber. 1942.
- Four Quartets. New York: Harcourt, Brace. 1943. (Note: Four Quartets was published in London by Faber in 1944.)
- A Practical Possum. Cambridge: Harvard Printing Office. 1947.
- Selected Poems. Harmondsworth: Penguin/Faber. 1948.
- The Undergraduate Poems of T. S. Eliot. Cambridge: Harvard Printing Office.
- Poems Written in Early Youth. Stockholm: Privately printed. 1950. (Note: In 1967 this was reprinted for the public trade by Faber & Faber for the U.K. market and Farrar Straus & Giroux for the U.S. market. These poems do not appear in The Complete Poems and Plays or Collected Poems.)
- The Complete Poems and Plays. New York: Harcourt, Brace. 1952.
- The Cultivation of Christmas Trees. London: Faber. 1954.
- Collected Poems 1909–1962. London: Faber. 1963.
- Valerie Eliot, ed. (1971). The Waste Land: A Facsimile and Transcript of the Original Drafts. London: Faber. ISBN 9780571097128. (Note: Contains previously unpublished poems and drafts of poems.)
- Christopher Ricks, ed. (1996). Inventions of the March Hare: Poems, 1909–1917. London: Faber. (Note: Contains previously unpublished poems and drafts of poems.)
- Christopher Ricks and Jim McCue, ed. (2015). The Poems of T. S. Eliot, Volume 1: Collected & Uncollected Poems. London: Faber & Faber. ISBN 9780571238705. (Note: Contains previously unpublished poems and drafts of poems.)
- Christopher Ricks and Jim McCue, ed. (2015). The Poems of T. S. Eliot, Volume 2: Practical Cats & Further Verses. London: Faber & Faber. ISBN 978-1421420189. (Note: Contains previously unpublished poems and drafts of poems.)

== Plays ==
The following is a list of plays by T. S. Eliot arranged chronologically by first edition.

- Sweeney Agonistes: Fragments of an Aristophanic Melodrama. London: Faber. 1932.
- The Rock: A Pageant Play. London: Faber. 1934.
- Murder in the Cathedral. London: Faber. 1935.
- The Family Reunion. London: Faber. 1939.
- The Cocktail Party. London: Faber. 1950.
- The Film of Murder in the Cathedral. London: Faber. 1952. (Note: The Film of Murder in the Cathedral was co-written by T. S. Eliot and George Hoellering.)
- The Confidential Clerk. London: Faber. 1954.
- The Elder Statesman. London: Faber. 1959.
- Collected Plays. London: Faber. 1962.
- The Complete Plays of T. S. Eliot. London: Houghton Mifflin Harcourt. 1967.

== Fiction ==
- "Eeldrop and Appleplex", I. Little Review, Chicago, IL, IV. 1 (May 1917) pp. 7–11
- "Eeldrop and Appleplex", II. Little Review, Chicago, IL, IV. 5 (Sept 1917) pp. 16–19
- "Eeldrop and Appleplex", both parts, The Foundling Press, Tunbridge Wells (1992) limited edition of 500 copies

== Non-fiction ==
The following is a list of non-fiction books by T. S. Eliot arranged chronologically by first edition.

- Ezra Pound: His Metric and Poetry. New York: Knopf. 1918.
- The Sacred Wood: Essays on Poetry and Criticism. London: Methuen. 1920.
- Homage to John Dryden: Three Essays on Poetry of the Seventeenth Century. London: The Hogarth Press. 1924.
- Shakespeare and the Stoicism of Seneca. London: Oxford University Press. 1927.
- For Lancelot Andrewes: Essays on Style and Order. London: Faber & Gwyer. 1928.
- Dante. London: Faber. 1929.
- Thoughts After Lambeth. London: Faber. 1931.
- Charles Whibley: A Memoir. London: Oxford University Press. 1931.
- Selected Essays, 1917–1932. London: Faber. 1932.
- John Dryden: The Poet, the Dramatist, the Critic. New York: Terence & Elsa Holliday. 1932.
- The Use of Poetry and the Use of Criticism: Studies in the Relation of Criticism to Poetry in England. London: Faber. 1933.
- After Strange Gods: A Primer of Modern Heresy. London: Faber. 1934.
- Elizabethan Essays. London: Faber. 1934. (Note: The book was revised as Essays on Elizabethan Drama (1956) and Elizabethan Dramatists (1963).)
- Essays Ancient & Modern. London: Faber. 1936.
- The Idea of a Christian Society. London: Faber. 1939.
- John Haywood, ed. (1941). Points of View. London: Faber.
- The Classics and the Man of Letters. London: Oxford University Press. 1942.
- Introducing James Joyce - a selection of Joyce's prose. London: Faber. 1942.
- The Music of Poetry. Glasgow: Jackson, Son, Publishers to the University. 1942.
- Reunion by Destruction. London: Pax House. 1943.
- What Is a Classic?. London: Faber. 1945.
- On Poetry. Concord: Concord Academy. 1947.
- Milton. London: Geoffrey Cumberlege. 1947.
- A Sermon. Cambridge: Cambridge University Press. 1948.
- Notes Towards the Definition of Culture. London: Faber. 1948.
- From Poe to Valéry. New York: Harcourt, Brace. 1948.
- The Aims of Poetic Drama. London: Poets' Theatre Guild. 1949.
- Poetry and Drama. Cambridge: Harvard University Press. 1951.
- An Address to Members of the London Library. London: London Library. 1952.
- The Value and Use of Cathedrals in England Today. Chichester: Friends of Chichester Cathedral. 1952.
- American Literature and the American Language. St. Louis: Washington University. 1953.
- The Three Voices of Poetry. Cambridge: Cambridge University Press. 1953.
- Religious Drama: Mediaeval and Modern. New York: House of Books. 1954.
- The Literature of Politics. London: Conservative Political Centre. 1955.
- The Frontiers of Criticism. Minneapolis: University of Minnesota Press. 1956.
- On Poetry and Poets. London: Faber. 1957. ISBN 9780571089833.
- Geoffrey Faber 1889–1961. London: Faber. 1961.
- George Herbert. London: Longmans. 1962.
- Knowledge and Experience in the Philosophy of F. H. Bradley. London: Faber. 1964.
- To Criticize the Critic and Other Writings. London: Faber. 1965.
- Frank Kermode, ed. (1975). Selected Prose of T.S. Eliot. London: Faber.
- Ronald Schuchard, ed. (1993). The Varieties of Metaphysical Poetry: The Clark Lectures at Trinity College, Cambridge, 1926, and the Turnbull Lectures at the Johns Hopkins University, 1933. London: Faber.

== Letters ==
The following is a list of books of letters by T. S. Eliot arranged chronologically by first edition.

- Valerie Eliot, ed. (1988). The Letters of T. S. Eliot. Vol. 1, 1898–1922. London: Faber and Faber. ISBN 978-0571235094.
- Valerie Eliot and Hugh Haughton, ed. (2009). The Letters of T. S. Eliot. Vol. 2, 1923–1925. London: Faber and Faber. ISBN 978-0571140817.
- Valerie Eliot and John Haffenden, ed. (2012). The Letters of T. S. Eliot. Vol. 3, 1926–1927. London: Faber and Faber. ISBN 978-0300187236.
- Valerie Eliot and John Haffenden, ed. (2013). The Letters of T. S. Eliot. Vol. 4, 1928–1929. London: Faber and Faber. ISBN 978-0571290925.
- Valerie Eliot and John Haffenden, ed. (2014). The Letters of T. S. Eliot. Vol. 5, 1930–1931. London: Faber and Faber. ISBN 978-0571316328.
- Valerie Eliot and John Haffenden, ed. (2016). The Letters of T. S. Eliot. Vol. 6, 1932–1933. London: Faber and Faber. ISBN 978-0571316342.
- Valerie Eliot and John Haffenden, ed. (2017). The Letters of T. S. Eliot. Vol. 7, 1934–1935. London: Faber and Faber. ISBN 978-0571316366.
- Valerie Eliot and John Haffenden, ed. (2019). The Letters of T. S. Eliot. Vol. 8, 1936–1938. London: Faber and Faber. ISBN 978-0571316380.
- Valerie Eliot and John Haffenden, ed. (2021). The Letters of T. S. Eliot. Vol. 9, 1939-1941. London: Faber and Faber. ISBN 978-0571362813.
- Valerie Eliot and John Haffenden, ed. (2025). The Letters of T. S. Eliot. Vol. 10, 1942-1944. London: Faber and Faber. ISBN 978-0571396498.

The complete digital collection of T.S. Eliot's letters to Emily Hale, edited by John Haffenden, is accessible here

== Works on T. S. Eliot ==
The following is a list of works about T. S. Eliot and his works.

- Ackroyd, Peter (1984). T. S. Eliot: A Life. New York: Simon & Schuster. ISBN 978-0-671-53043-3.
- Bergsten, Staffan (1960). Time and Eternity: A Study in the Structure and Symbolism of T. S. Eliot's Four Quartets. Stockholm: Svenska bokförlaget.
- Blamires, Harry (1969). Word Unheard: A Guide Through Eliot's Four Quartets. London: Methuen. ISBN 9780416140200.
- Buller, Norman (Jun–Jul 2014). "T. S. Eliot and La figlia che piange". The London Magazine: 11–19.
- Clarke, Graham, ed. (1990). T. S. Eliot: Critical Assessments. London: Helm. ISBN 978-0-7470-0419-6.
- Cooper, John Xiros (1995). T. S. Eliot and the Ideology of Four Quartets. Cambridge: Cambridge University Press. ISBN 978-0-521-49629-2.
- Dickey, Frances (Dec 2020). "May the Record Speak: The Correspondence of T.S. Eliot and Emily Hale". Twentieth-Century Literature 66, No. 4: 431–62.
- Drew, Elizabeth A. (1949). T. S. Eliot: the Design of His Poetry. New York: Scribner. ISBN 978-0-684-10131-6.
- Frye, Northrop (1963). T. S. Eliot. Edinburgh: Oliver and Boyd.
- Gardner, Helen (1978). The Composition of Four Quartets. London: Faber.
- Gordon, Lyndall (1998). T. S. Eliot: An Imperfect Life. London: Vintage. ISBN 978-0-393-04728-8.
- Grant, Michael, ed. (1982). T. S. Eliot: The Critical Heritage. London: Routledge & Kegan Paul.
- Julius, Anthony (1995). T. S. Eliot: anti-Semitism and literary form. Cambridge, England: Cambridge University Press. ISBN 0-521-47063-3.
- Kenner, Hugh (1959). The invisible poet: T. S. Eliot. London: Metheun & Co. Ltd. ISBN 9780416688603.
- Kirk, Russell (2008). Benjamin G. Lockerd Jr. (ed.). Eliot and His Age: T. S. Eliot's Moral Imagination in the Twentieth Century (revised second ed.). Wilmington: Intercollegiate Studies Institute. ISBN 978-1-933859-53-8.
- Kojecky, Roger (1971). T.S. Eliot's Social Criticism. London: Faber. ISBN 0-571-09692-1.
- Jones, David E. (1960). The Plays of T. S. Eliot. London: Routledge & Kegan Paul.
- Matthews, T. S. (1973). Great Tom: Notes Towards the Definition of T. S. Eliot. New York: Harper & Row. ISBN 978-0-06-012838-8.
- Matthiessen, Francis Otto (1958). The Achievement of T. S. Eliot: An Essay on the Nature of Poetry. New York.
- Maxwell, Desmond (1952). The Poetry of T. S. Eliot. London: Routledge & Kegan Paul. ISBN 978-0-7100-1810-6.
- Mayer, John T. (1989). T. S. Eliot's Silent Voices. New York: Oxford University Press. ISBN 978-0-19-505668-6.
- Miller, James Edwin Jr. (2005). T. S. Eliot: The Making of an American Poet, 1888–1922. University Park: Pennsylvania State University Press. ISBN 978-0-271-02681-7.
- Murray, Paul (1991). T. S. Eliot and Mysticism: The Secret History of Four Quartets. Basingstoke: MacMillan. ISBN 978-0-312-03531-0.
- Narita, Tatsushi (2011). T. S. Eliot and his Youth as "A Literary Columbus". Nagoya: Kougaku Shuppan. ISBN 978-4-903742-15-1.
- North, Michael, ed. (2001). The Waste Land: Authoritative Text, Contexts, Criticism (Norton Critical ed.). New York: Norton.
- Oser, Lee (1998). T.S. Eliot and American poetry. Columbia, MO: University of Missouri Press. ISBN 0-8262-1181-X. OCLC 39013771.
- Quillian, William H. (1983). Hamlet and the New Poetic: James Joyce and T. S. Eliot. Ann Arbor: UMI Research Press. ISBN 978-0-8357-1422-8.
- Raine, Craig (2006). T. S. Eliot (Lives & Legacies). New York: Oxford University Press. ISBN 978-0-19-977417-3.
- Rainey, Lawrence, ed. (2005). The Annotated Waste Land, with T. S. Eliot's Contemporary Prose. New Haven: Yale University Press.
- Schuchard, Ronald (1999). Eliot's Dark Angel: Intersections of Life and Art. New York: Oxford University Press. ISBN 978-0-19-510417-2.
- Scofield, Dr. Martin (1988). T. S. Eliot: The Poems. Cambridge: Cambridge University Press. ISBN 978-0-521-30147-3.
- Sencourt, Robert (1971). Donald Adamson (ed.). T. S. Eliot: A Memoir. New York: Dodd, Mead. ISBN 9780396063476.
- Sigg, Eric (1989). The American T. S. Eliot: A Study of the Early Writings. Cambridge: Cambridge University Press. ISBN 978-0-521-36561-1.
- Smidt, Kristian (1961). Poetry and Belief in the Work of T. S. Eliot. London: Routledge and Kegan Paul.
- Smith, Grover Cleveland Jr. (1956). T. S. Eliot's Poetry and Plays : a Study In Sources and Meaning. Chicago: University Press. ISBN 978-0-226-76438-2.
- Smith, Grover Cleveland Jr. (1983). The Waste Land. London: Allen & Unwin.
- Spender, Stephen (1975). T. S. Eliot. New York: Viking. ISBN 978-0-670-29184-7.
- Spurr, Barry (2009). Anglo-Catholic in Religion: T. S. Eliot and Christianity. Cambridge: The Lutterworth Press. ISBN 978-0-7188-3073-1.
- Sullivan, Sheila, ed. (1973). Critics on T. S. Eliot: Readings in Literary Criticism. London: Allen and Unwin.
- Tate, Allen, ed. (1967). T. S. Eliot: the Man and His Work. London: Chatto & Windus.
- Traversi, Derek (1976). T. S. Eliot The Longer Poems: The Waste Land; Ash Wednesday; Four Quartets. London: The Bodley Head. ISBN 0-370-10671-7.
- Unger, Leonard, ed. (1948). T. S. Eliot: A Selected Critique. New York: Rinehart.
- Williamson, George (1953). A Reader's Guide to T. S. Eliot: a Poem-By-Poem Analysis. New York: Noonday Press. ISBN 978-0-8156-0500-3.
