= Ariel poems =

Ariel poems can refer to:

- Ariel poems (Eliot), by T. S. Eliot
- Ariel poems (Faber), pamphlets published by Faber and Gwyer

== See also ==
- Ariel (poetry collection), poems by Sylvia Plath
