= Paul Murray (poet) =

Catholic Priest,Dominican Order, Irish poet and academic

The Reverend Paul Murray O.P.
- Title: Father

Personal life
- Born: 26 November 1947 (age 78) Newcastle, County Down
- Education: University College Dublin; Pontifical University of Saint Thomas Aquinas
- Other name: "Father Paul"

Religious life
- Religion: Roman Catholic
- Order: Dominican
- Profession: 1967
- Ordination: 1973

Senior posting
- Based in: Rome, Italy
- Present post: Rome, Italy

Paul Brendan Murray, O.P. (born 26 November 1947) is an Irish Dominican priest of the Catholic Church, poet, writer, and professor.

Murray was born at Newcastle, County Down, in Northern Ireland. In 1966 he joined the Irish Dominican Province, and was ordained a priest in 1973. Since 1994 he has lived in Rome, Italy, where he teaches the literature of the mystical tradition at the Pontifical University of St. Thomas Aquinas, also known as the Angelicum. He holds a doctorate in English Literature from University College Dublin. In 2012 Paul Murray was conferred with honorary degree of Master of Sacred Theology at a ceremony in St Mary's Priory, Tallaght, Dublin.

== Bibliography ==
=== Prose ===
- The Mysticism Debate (1977)
- T.S. Eliot and Mysticism: The Secret History of the Four Quartets (1991)
- A Journey with Jonah: The Spirituality of Bewilderment (2002)
- Preachers at Prayer (2003)
- The New Wine of Dominican Spirituality: A Drink Called Happiness (2003)
- "I Loved Jesus in the Night": Teresa of Calcutta, A Secret Revealed (2008)
- Door into the Sacred: A Meditation on the Hail Mary (2010)
- Praying with Confidence: Aquinas on the Lord's Prayer (2010)
- In the Grip of Light: The Dark and Bright Journey of Christian Contemplation (2012)
- Aquinas at Prayer: The Bible, Mysticism and Poetry (2013)
- Scars: Essays, Poems and Meditations on Affliction (2014)
- God's Spies: Michelangelo, Shakespeare and Other Poets of Vision (2019)
- Saint Catherine of Siena: Mystic of Fire, Preacher of Freedom (2020)
- Preachers at Prayer: Soundings in the Dominican Spiritual Tradition (2024)

=== Poetry ===
- Ritual Poems (1971)
- Rites and Meditations (1982)
- The Absent Fountain (1992)
- These Black Stars (2003)
- Stones and Stars (2013)
- Light at the Torn Horizon (2022)
- Moling in Meditation: A Psalter for an Early Irish Monk (2023)

=== Books for children ===
- The Mother of Jesus is Wonderfully Real (2021)

== See also ==
- Faber Book of Irish Verse - an anthology of Irish poetry which includes a poem by Murray
- T. S. Eliot bibliography - see section titled Works on T.S Eliot
- List of writers of Northern Ireland
