= Ariel Poems (Faber) =

Pamphlets published by Faber and Gwyer

The Ariel Poems were two series of pamphlets that contained illustrated poems published by Faber and Gwyer and later by Faber and Faber. The first series had 38 titles published between 1927 and 1931, which were printed at the Curwen Press. The second series, published in 1954, had 8 titles.

Each numbered pamphlet had an illustrated cover naming the author and illustrator. Four pages were sewn inside the cover. The frontispiece had another illustration, usually multicolored. Following that page was the poem. Several authors and illustrators had multiple pamphlets.

The pamphlets in the first series, in order, are as follows:

1. Yuletide in a Younger World by Thomas Hardy, drawings by Albert Rutherston
2. The Linnet's Nest by Henry Newbolt, drawings by Ralph Keene
3. The Wonder Night by Laurence Binyon, drawings by Barnett Freedman
4. Alone by Walter de la Mare, wood engravings by Blair Hughes-Stanton
5. Gloria in Profundis by G. K. Chesterton, wood engravings by Eric Gill
6. The Early Whistler by Wilfred Gibson, drawings by John Nash
7. Nativity by Siegfried Sassoon, designs by Paul Nash
8. Journey of the Magi by T. S. Eliot, drawings by E. McKnight Kauffer (August 1927)
9. The Chanty of the Nona, poem and drawings by Hilaire Belloc
10. Moss and Feather by W. H. Davies, illustrated by Sir William Nicholson
11. Self to Self by Walter de la Mare, wood engravings by Blair Hughes-Stanton
12. Troy by Humbert Wolfe, drawings by Charles Ricketts
13. The Winter Solstice by Harold Monro, drawings by David Jones
14. To My Mother by Siegfried Sassoon, drawings by Stephen Tennant
15. Popular Song by Edith Sitwell, designs by Edward Bawden
16. A Song for Simeon by T. S. Eliot, drawings by E. McKnight Kauffer (September 1928)
17. Winter Nights, a reminiscence by Edmund Blunden, drawings by Albert Rutherston
18. Three Things by W. B. Yeats, drawings by Gilbert Spencer
19. Dark Weeping by "AE", designs by Paul Nash
20. A Snowdrop by Walter de la Mare, drawings by Claudia Guercio
21. Ubi Ecclesia by G. K. Chesterton, drawings by Diana Murphy
22. The Outcast by James Stephens, drawings by Althea Willoughby
23. Animula by T. S. Eliot, wood engravings by Gertrude Hermes (October 1929)
24. Inscription on a Fountain-Head by Peter Quennell, drawings by Albert Rutherston
25. The Grave of Arthur by G. K. Chesterton, drawings by Celia Fiennes
26. Elm Angel by Harold Monro, wood engravings by Eric Ravilious
27. In Sicily by Siegfried Sassoon, drawings by Stephen Tennant
28. The Triumph of the Machine by D. H. Lawrence, drawings by Althea Willoughby
29. Marina by T. S. Eliot, drawings by E. McKnight Kauffer (September 1930)
30. The Gum Trees by Roy Campbell, drawings by David Jones
31. News by Walter de la Mare, drawings by Barnett Freedman
32. A Child is Born by Henry Newbolt, drawings by Althea Willoughby
33. To Lucy by Walter de la Mare, drawings by Albert Rutherston
34. To the Red Rose by Siegfried Sassoon, drawings by Stephen Tennant
35. Triumphal March by T. S. Eliot, drawings by E. McKnight Kauffer (October 1931)
36. Jane Barston 1719-1746 by Edith Sitwell, drawings by R. A. Davies
37. Invitation To Cast Out Care by Vita Sackville-West, drawings by Graham Sutherland
38. Choosing A Mast by Roy Campbell, drawings by Barnett Freedman

The pamphlets in the second series are as follows:

1. The Cultivation of Christmas Trees by T. S. Eliot, drawings by David Jones
2. Mountains by W.H. Auden, drawings by Edward Bawden
3. Christmas Eve by C. Day-Lewis, drawings by Edward Ardizzone
4. Nativity by Roy Campbell, drawings by James Sellars
5. The Other Wing by Louis MacNeice, drawings by Michael Ayrton
6. Sirmione Peninsula by Stephen Sender, drawings by Lynton Lamb
7. Prometheus by Edwin Muir, drawings by John Piper
8. The Winnowing Dream by Walter de la Mare, drawings by Robin Jaques

== See also ==
- T. S. Eliot's Ariel poems

== External sources ==
- The Ariel Poems, London, UK: Faber and Gwyer then Faber and Faber, 1927–1931, OCLC 5345869, also OCLC 317257918, 723752577, 752417782
- Webb, Poul (March 2013). "ART & ARTISTS: The Ariel Poems – part 1". poulwebb.blogspot.com. Archived from the original on 2013-07-11. This contains cover and frontispiece illustrations for poems 1–19.
- Webb, Poul (March 2013). "ART & ARTISTS: The Ariel Poems – part 2". poulwebb.blogspot.com. Archived from the original on 2013-07-11. This contains cover and frontispiece illustrations for poems 20–38.
