= T. S. Eliot's Ariel poems =

Series of poems by T. S. Eliot

T. S. Eliot's Ariel poems are those written for Faber and Faber's series of Ariel Poems. All but "Triumphal March" also appear in his book Collected Poems: 1909–1962 under the heading Ariel Poems.

== Writing and publication history ==
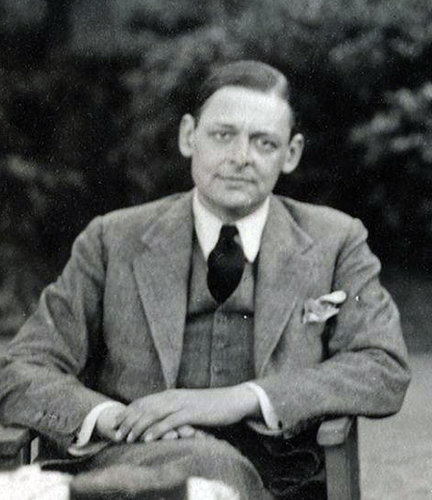
T. S. Eliot in 1934

In 1925, Eliot became a poetry editor at the London publishing firm of Faber & Gwyer, Ltd., after a career in banking, and subsequent to the success of his earlier poems, including "The Love Song of J. Alfred Prufrock" (1915), "Gerontion" (1920) and "The Waste Land" (1922).

In 1927, Eliot was asked by his employer, Geoffrey Faber, one of the partners in Faber & Gwyer, to write one poem each year for a series of illustrated pamphlets with holiday themes to be sent to the firm's clients and business acquaintances as Christmas greetings. This series, called the "Ariel Series", would release 38 pamphlets from a selection of English writers and poets from 1927 through 1931. The first poem that Eliot wrote, "The Journey of the Magi", was released as the eighth in the series in August 1927. For the second, "A Song for Simeon", Eliot turned to an event at the end of Nativity narrative in the Gospel of Luke. Faber released this pamphlet, the sixteenth in the series on 24 September 1928. Eliot would follow with three more poems, "Animula" in October 1929, "Marina" in September 1930, and "Triumphal March" in October 1931. Four of the five poems were accompanied by illustrations by American avant garde artist E. McKnight Kauffer.

In 1936, Faber & Faber, the successor firm to Faber & Gwyer, collected "A Song for Simeon" and three of the other poems under the heading "Ariel Poems" for an edition of Eliot's collected poems. When Faber released another series in 1954, Eliot included a sixth poem, "The Cultivation of Christmas Trees", which was added to Faber's 1963 edition of his collected poems. Both editions of collected poems were published in the United States by Harcourt, Brace & Company.

All six poems were published together as a separate publication for the first time by Faber & Faber in 2014. This publication included the original illustrations.

== Ariel Poems ==
=== "The Journey of the Magi" ===
- First published August 25, 1927.
- Numbered 8 in the series.
- Drawings by E. McKnight Kauffer.
- Numbered A9 in Gallup's bibliography of Eliot's works.

=== "A Song for Simeon" ===
- First published September 24, 1928
- Numbered 16 in the series.
- Drawing by E. McKnight Kauffer.
- Numbered A11 in Gallup's bibliography of Eliot's works.

=== "Animula" ===
- First published October 9, 1929.
- Numbered 23 in the series.
- Wood-engravings by Gertrude Hermes.
- Numbered A14 in Gallup's bibliography of Eliot's works.

=== "Marina" ===
- First published September 25, 1930.
- Numbered 29 in the series.
- Drawings by E. McKnight Kauffer.
- Numbered A17 in Gallup's bibliography of Eliot's works.

=== "Triumphal March" ===
- First published October 29, 1931.
- Numbered 35 in the series.
- Drawings by E. McKnight Kauffer.
- Numbered A19 in Gallup's bibliography of Eliot's works.

While this poem was published as part of Faber & Faber's series of "Ariel Poems" it is not included with the rest of poems in the "Ariel Poems" section of Eliot's collected poems. It appears as Section 1 of "Coriolan" in the "Unfinished Poems" section.

=== "The Cultivation of Christmas Trees" ===
- First published October 26, 1954.
- Part of a new series of "Ariel Poems" published by Faber & Faber.
- Illustrated by David Jones.
- Numbered A66 in Gallup's bibliography of Eliot's works.
