= Gerontion =

Poem by T S Eliot

"Gerontion" is a poem by T. S. Eliot that was first published in 1920 in Ara Vos Prec (his volume of collected poems published in London) and Poems (an almost identical collection published simultaneously in New York). The title is Greek for "little old man," and the poem is a dramatic monologue relating the opinions and impressions of an elderly man, which describes Europe after World War I through the eyes of a man who has lived most of his life in the 19th century. Two years after it was published, Eliot considered including the poem as a preface to The Waste Land, but was talked out of this by Ezra Pound. Along with "The Love Song of J. Alfred Prufrock" and The Waste Land, and other works published by Eliot in the early part of his career, '"Gerontion" discusses themes of religion, sexuality, and other general topics of modernist poetry.

== History ==
"Gerontion" is one of the handful of poems that Eliot composed between the end of World War I in 1918 and his work on The Waste Land in 1921. During that time, Eliot was working at Lloyds Bank and editing The Egoist, devoting most of his literary energy to writing review articles for periodicals. When he published the two collections in February, 1920 Ara Vos Prec, "Gerontion" was almost the only poem he had never offered to the public before and was placed first in both volumes.

Two earlier versions of the poem can be found, the original typescript of the poem as well as that version with comments by Ezra Pound. In the typescript, the name of the poem is "Gerousia", referring to the name of the Council of the Elders at Sparta. Pound, who was living in London in 1919, was helping Eliot revise the poem (encouraging him to delete roughly one third of the text). When Eliot proposed publishing Gerontion as the opening part of The Waste Land, Pound discouraged him: "I do not advise printing Gerontion as preface. One don't miss it at all as the thing now stands. To be more lucid still, let me say that I advise you NOT to print Gerontion as prelude." The lines were never added to the text and remained an individual poem.

== The poem ==
"Gerontion" opens with an epigraph from Shakespeare's play Measure for Measure:

Thou hast nor youth nor age
But as it were an after dinner sleep
Dreaming of both.

The poem itself is a dramatic monologue by an elderly character. The use of "us" and "I" regarding the speaker and a member of the opposite sex as well as the general discourse in lines 53–58, in the opinion of Anthony David Moody, presents the same sexual themes that face Prufrock, only this time they meet with the body of an older man. The poem is a free verse monologue describing his household (a boy reading to him, a woman tending to the kitchen, and the Jewish landlord), and mentioning four others (three with European names and one Japanese) who seem to inhabit the same boarding house. The poem then moves to an abstract meditation on a kind of spiritual malaise. It concludes with the lines,

Tenants of the house
Thoughts of a dry brain in a dry season.

which describes the monologue as the production of the "dry brain" of the narrator in the "dry season" of his age. Hugh Kenner suggests that these "tenants" are the voices of The Waste Land and that Eliot is describing the method of the poem's narrative by saying that the speaker uses several different voices to express the impressions of Gerontion. Kenner also suggests that the poem resembles a portion of a Jacobean play as it relates its story in fragments and lacks a formal plot.

== Themes ==
Many of the themes within "Gerontion" are present throughout Eliot's later works, especially within The Waste Land. This is especially true of the internal struggle within the poem and the narrator's "waiting for rain". Time is also altered by allowing past and present to be superimposed, and a series of places and characters connected to various cultures are introduced.

=== Religion ===
To Donald J. Childs, the poem attempts to present the theme of Christianity from the viewpoint of the modernist individual with various references to the Incarnation and salvation. Childs believes that the poem moves from Christmas Day in line 19 ("in the Juvescence of the year") to the Crucifixion in line 21 as it speaks of "depraved May" and "flowering Judas". He argues that Gerontion contemplates the "paradoxical recovery of freedom through slavery and grace through sin". In line 20, the narrator refers to Jesus as "Christ the tiger", which emphasizes judgment rather than compassion, according to Jewel Spears Brooker in Mystery and Escape: T. S. Eliot and the Dialectic of Modernism.

Peter Sharpe states that "Gerontion" is the poem that shows Eliot "taking on the mantle of his New England Puritan forebears" as Gerontion views his life as the product of sin. Sharpe suggests that Christ appears to Gerontion as a scourge because he understands that he must reject the "dead world" to obtain the salvation offered by Christianity. However, other critics disagree; Russell Kirk believes that the poem is "a description of life devoid of faith, drearily parched, it is cautionary". Marion Montgomery writes that Gerontion's "problem is that he can discover no vital presence in the sinful shell of his body".

In The American T. S. Eliot, Eric Whitman Sigg describes the poem as "a portrait of religious disillusion and despair", and suggests that the poem, like "The Love Song of J. Alfred Prufrock", explores the relationship between action and inaction and their consequences. To this, Alfred Kazin adds that Eliot, especially in "Gerontion" shows that "it is easier for God to devour us than for us to partake of Him in a seemly spirit." To Kazin, it is religion, not faith that Eliot describes through the narrative of "Gerontion", and that religion is important not because of its spirituality but because of "the 'culture' it leaves". Kazin suggests that in lines 33–36 the poem attempts to show how Eliot tells his generation that history is "nothing but human depravity":

After such knowledge, what forgiveness? Think now
History has many cunning passages, contrived corridors
And issues, deceives with whispering ambitions,
Guides us by vanities.

Nasreen Ayaz argues that in the fourth movement of the poem, Gerontion shows that his loss of faith in Christianity has resulted in an emotional sterility to go along with the physical. In that stanza he remembers a former mistress and regrets that he no longer has the ability to interact with her on a physical level. The "closer contact" sought by the narrator represents both the physical longing of intimacy as well as the emotional connection he previously had with the woman described in the poem.

In lines 17–19, Gerontion alludes to the Pharisees' statement to Christ in Matthew 12:38 when they say "Master, we would see a sign from thee." The narrator of the poem uses these words in a different manner:

Signs are taken for wonders. "We would see a sign!"
The word within a word, unable to speak a word,
Swaddled with darkness.

James Longenbach argues that these lines show that Gerontion is unable to extract the spiritual meaning of the Biblical text because he is unable to understand words in a spiritual sense: "Gerontion's words have no metaphysical buttressing, and his language is studded with puns, words within words. The passage on history is a series of metaphors that dissolve into incomprehensibility".

=== Sexuality ===
The narrator of the poem discusses sexuality throughout the text, spending several lines, including lines 57–58 where he says:

I have lost my passion: why should I need to keep it
Since what is kept must be adulterated?

Ian Duncan MacKillop in F. R. Leavis argues that impotence is a pretext of the poem the same way that embarrassment is the pretext of "Portrait of a Lady". He argues that the narrator writes each line of the poem with an understanding that he is unable to fulfill any of his sexual desires. Gelpi, in A Coherent Splendor: An American Poetic Renaissance also states that the poem is centred upon the theme of impotence, arguing that old age brings the poet "not wisdom but confirmed decrepitude and impotence." He also argues that this theme continues into Eliot's later works Ash Wednesday and Four Quartets. To Sharpe, the inability of the narrator to fulfill his sexual desires leads him to "humiliated arrogance" and the "apprehension of Judgement without the knowledge of God's mercy.

In lines 59–60, the speaker explains that he has lost his physical senses due to his age:

I have lost my sight, smell, hearing, taste and touch:
How should I use them for your closer contact?

Marion Montgomery, writing in T. S. Eliot: an Essay on the American Magus, equates the loss of these senses with the mindset that controls the narrative of the poem. Gerontion has lost the ability to partake in the same sexual endeavours that face Nathaniel Hawthorne's hero in "Young Goodman Brown", yet Montgomery believes he has "turned from innocent hope to pursue significance in the dark forces of the blood". Gerontion's exploration of sinful pleasures takes place in his mind, according to Montgomery, as he can "discover no vital presence in the sinful shell of his body".

== Other prominent lines ==
The phrase "wilderness of mirrors" from the poem has been borrowed by many other writers and artists. It has been used as the title of plays by Van Badham and Charles Evered, of novels by Max Frisch, and of albums by bands such as Waysted and The Black Angels. Rock singer Fish entitled his first solo album Vigil in a Wilderness of Mirrors.

Some commentators believe that James Jesus Angleton took the phrase from this poem when he described the confusion and strange loops of espionage and counter-intelligence, such as the Double-Cross System, as a "wilderness of mirrors". It thence entered and has since become commonplace in the vocabulary of writers of spy novels or of popular historical writing about espionage. It was the title of an episode of the television series JAG where the protagonist is subjected to disinformation.

Another prominent line in the poem, "In depraved May, dogwood and chestnut, flowering judas/To be eaten, to be divided, to be drunk", is the origin of the title of Katherine Anne Porter's first collection of short stories, Flowering Judas and Other Stories (1930).

== Sources ==
There is a connection between Gerontion and Eliot's understanding of F. H. Bradley's views. In Eliot's doctoral dissertation, later published as Knowledge and Experience in the Philosophy of F. H. Bradley, Eliot explores Bradley's philosophy to determine how the mind relates to reality. By relying on Bradley, Eliot is able to formulate his own scepticism and states: "Everything, from one point of view, is subjective; and everything, from another point of view is objective; and there is no absolute point of view from which a decision may be pronounced." In terms of poetic structure, Eliot was influenced by Jacobean dramatists such as Thomas Middleton that relied on blank verse in their dramatic monologues. Lines within the poems are connected to the works of a wide range of writers, including A. C. Benson, Lancelot Andrewes, and Henry Adams's The Education of Henry Adams.

== Critical response ==
Eliot scholar Grover Smith said of this poem, "If any notion remained that in the poems of 1919 Eliot was sentimentally contrasting a resplendent past with a dismal present, Gerontion should have helped to dispel it." Bernard Bergonzi writes that "Eliot's most considerable poem of the period between 1915 and 1919 is 'Gerontion'". Kirk believes that "To me, the blank verse of 'Gerontion' is Eliot's most moving poetry, but he never tried this virile mode later."

The literary critic Anthony Julius, who has analysed the presence of antisemitic rhetoric in Eliot's work, has cited "Gerontion" as an example of a poem by Eliot that contains anti-Semitic sentiments. In the voice of the poem's elderly narrator, the poem contains the line, "And the Jew squats on the window sill, the owner [of my building] / Spawned in some estaminet of Antwerp." However, a new interpretation by Ron Martinetti on American Legends website argues that the poem expresses the antisemitic views of historian Henry Adams, the poem's protagonist, and should not be attributed to Eliot himself.
