= Geoffrey Faber =

British academic, publisher, and poet

- Geoffrey Faber in 1954
- Born: 23 August 1889; Great Malvern, United Kingdom
- Died: March 31, 1961 (aged 71)
- Burial place: St. James's Church, Stedham, West Sussex

Sir Geoffrey Cust Faber (23 August 1889 – 31 March 1961) was a British academic, publisher, and poet. He was a nephew of the noted Catholic convert and hymn writer, Father Frederick William Faber, C.O., founder of the Brompton Oratory.

== Life ==
Faber was educated at Rugby School and Christ Church, Oxford. He gained a first in Classical Moderations in 1910 and a first in Literae Humaniores ('Greats') in 1912. In 1913 he joined the Oxford University Press.

A fellow of All Souls College, Oxford, he was the founding editor of Faber and Gwyer (shortly afterwards Faber and Faber), one of the most celebrated of literary publishing houses.

He was knighted in the 1954 New Years Honours List.

His grave is located in the churchyard of St. James's Church, Stedham, West Sussex.

== Works ==
- Interflow, Poems Mainly Lyrical (1915)
- In the Valley of Vision: Poems Written in Time of War (1918)
- Elnovia, An Entertainment for Novel Readers (1925)
- Oxford Apostles. A Character Study of the Oxford Movement (1933)
- A Publisher Speaking (1935)
- The Buried Stream: Collected Poems 1908–1940 (1941)
- Benjamin Jowett : A Portrait with Background (1957)
- Twelve Years (1962), a poem
- Modern First Editions: Points and Values

== Legacy ==
William Saroyan wrote a short story about Faber in his 1971 book, Letters from 74 rue Taitbout or Don't Go But If You Must Say Hello To Everybody.

== See also ==
- Geoffrey Faber Memorial Prize
