= Edward McKnight Kauffer =

American artist and graphic designer (1890–1954)

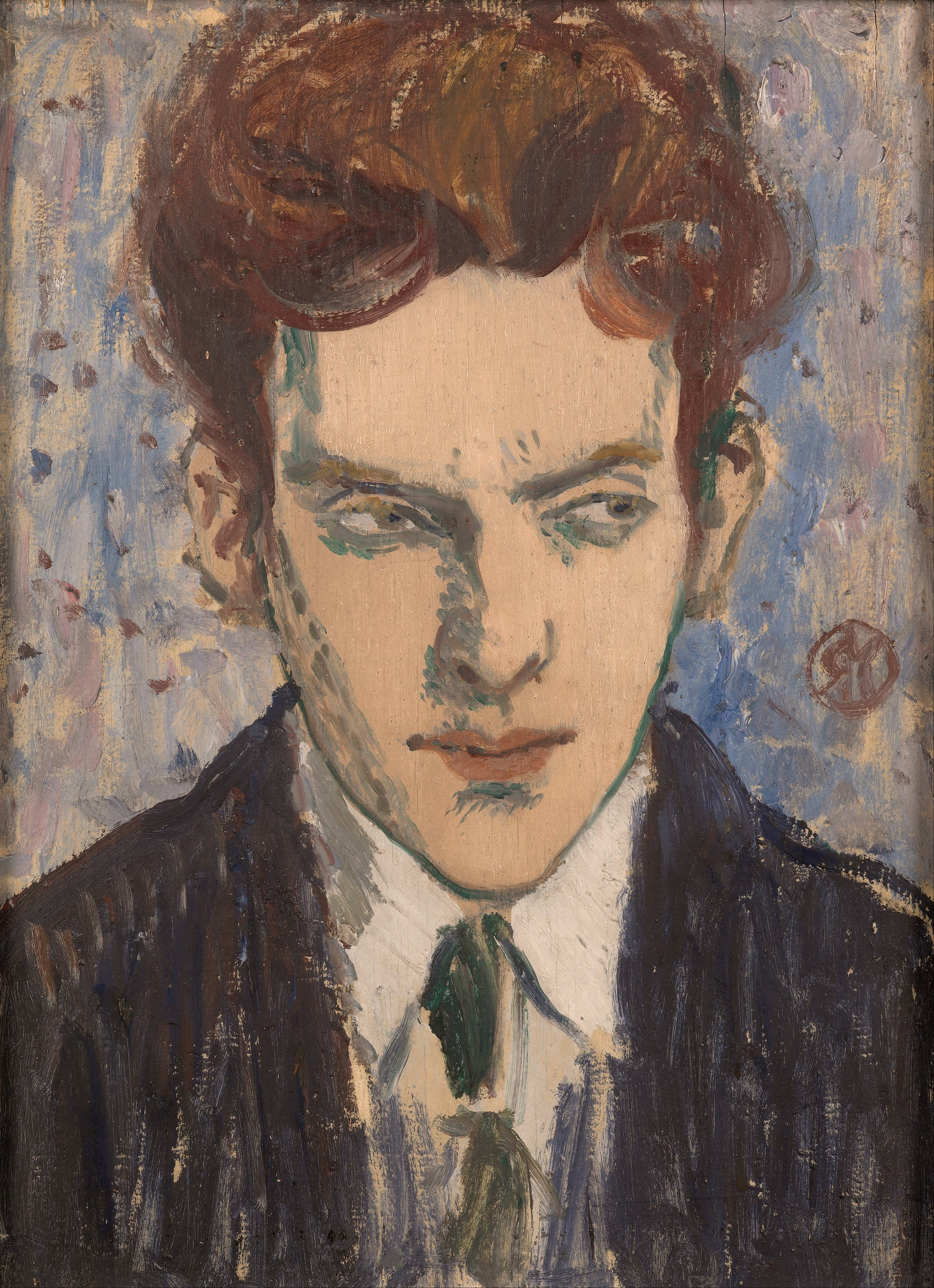
- Portrait of Edward McKnight Kauffer by Raymond McIntyre, c. 1915
- Born: Edward Leland Kauffer; 14 December 1890; Great Falls, Montana, US
- Died: 22 October 1954 (aged 63); New York City, US
- Known for: graphic design; poster art
- Movement: Group X; Cumberland Market Group
- Spouse(s): Grace Ehrlich; Marion Dorn

Edward McKnight Kauffer (14 December 1890 – 22 October 1954) was an American artist and graphic designer who lived for much of his life in the United Kingdom. He worked mainly in poster art, but was also active as a painter, book illustrator and theatre designer.

== Early life and education ==
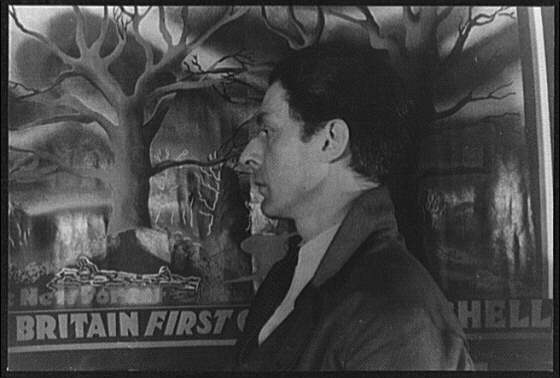
Portrait by Carl Van Vechten, 1937

Edward Leland Kauffer was born on 14 December 1890, in Great Falls, Montana. By 1910 he had moved to San Francisco working as a bookseller and studying art at the California School of Design from 1910 to 1912. At around this time Professor Joseph McKnight of the University of Utah became aware of Kauffer's work, sponsored him and paid to send him to Paris for further study. In gratitude Kauffer took his sponsor's name as a middle name.

== Career ==
On his way to Paris, Kauffer stopped in Chicago for six months in 1912/1913 and studied at the Art Institute of Chicago. While there he witnessed the Armory Show, one of the first major exhibitions to introduce the styles of modernism to American viewers. This likely had a major impact on Kauffer, who would work in many of the same styles throughout his career. He arrived in Paris in 1913 and studied at the Académie Moderne until 1914.

At the outbreak of the First World War in 1914, he moved from Paris to London with his new wife, American pianist Grace (née Ehrlich). Their daughter, Ann (6 October 1920 - 1996) would join the Women’s Auxiliary Air Force in the Second World War and work in photo intelligence alongside Constance Babington Smith, Eve Holiday, and Sarah Oliver, (Winston Churchill's daughter).

On a visit to Paris in 1923, he met the American textile designer Marion Dorn (1896–1964). He left his wife and daughter and subsequently lived with her in London from late 1923.

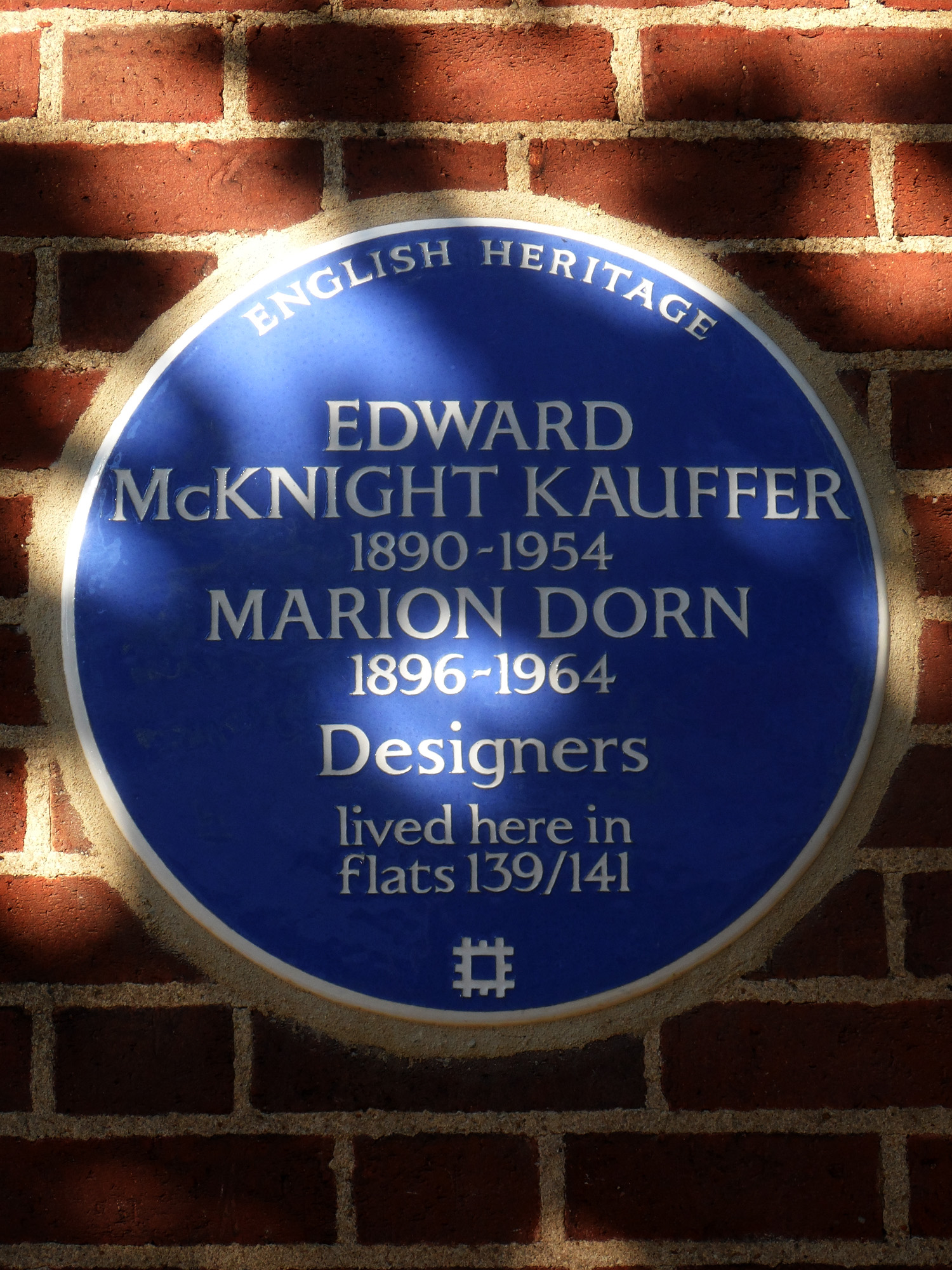
Blue plaque erected in 2015 by English Heritage at Swan Court, Chelsea Manor Street, Chelsea, London SW3 5RY, Royal Borough of Kensington and Chelsea.

Kauffer remained in London for most of his career. He was briefly associated with Robert Bevan's Cumberland Market Group and had a one-man show at the Omega Workshops. In Brighton on the south coast, he designed a "novel" mural for the lobby of Embassy Court, a Modernist block of flats designed by Wells Coates in 1935. The mural consisted of "monochrome photographs ... printed directly on to a light-sensitive cellulose coating".

Kauffer may be best known for the 140 posters that he produced for London Underground, and later London Transport. The posters span many styles: many show abstract influences, including futurism, cubism, and vorticism; others evoke impressionist influences such as Japanese woodcuts.

He created posters for Shell Oil, the Great Western Railway and other commercial clients, and also illustrated books and book covers. Later he also became interested in textiles, interior design and theatrical design. He designed the cover of the Radio Times' 1926 and 1927 Christmas Numbers. In 1930 he created a series of airbrush illustrations for The World in 2030 by Lord Birkenhead.

In July 1940, at the beginning of the Second World War, he and Marion Dorn returned to New York City, where they married in 1950 but separated in 1953. In New York his commissions began with MOMA and he went on to produce war propaganda posters. In 1947, he was approached to do a series of posters for American Airlines, which became his primary client until his death. In 1952, he designed what is perhaps his most famous work, the dust jacket art of Ralph Ellison's novel Invisible Man. He died two years later, in 1954.

== Gallery ==
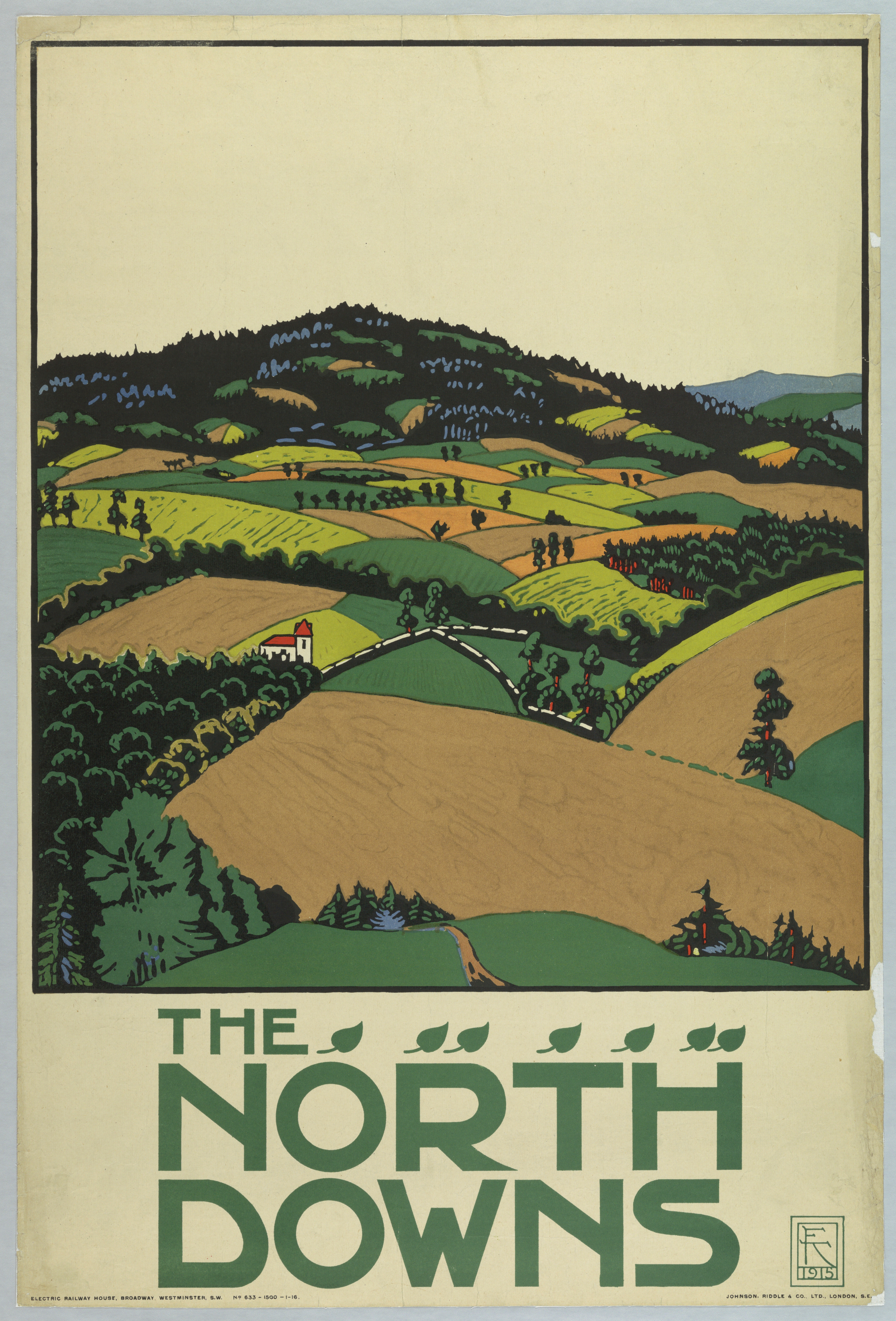
Poster, The North Downs, for London Underground (1915)

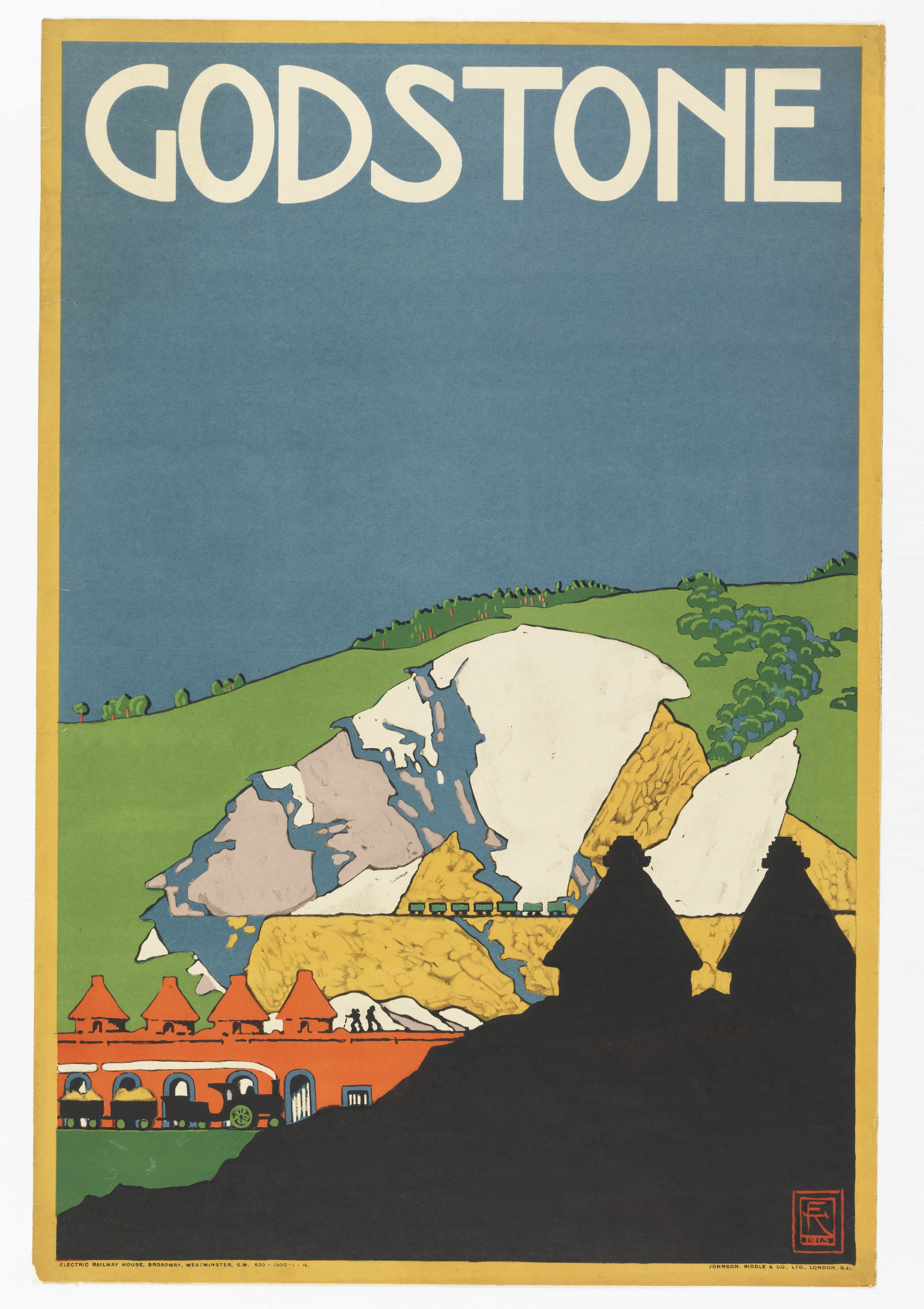
Poster, Godstone, for London Underground (1915)

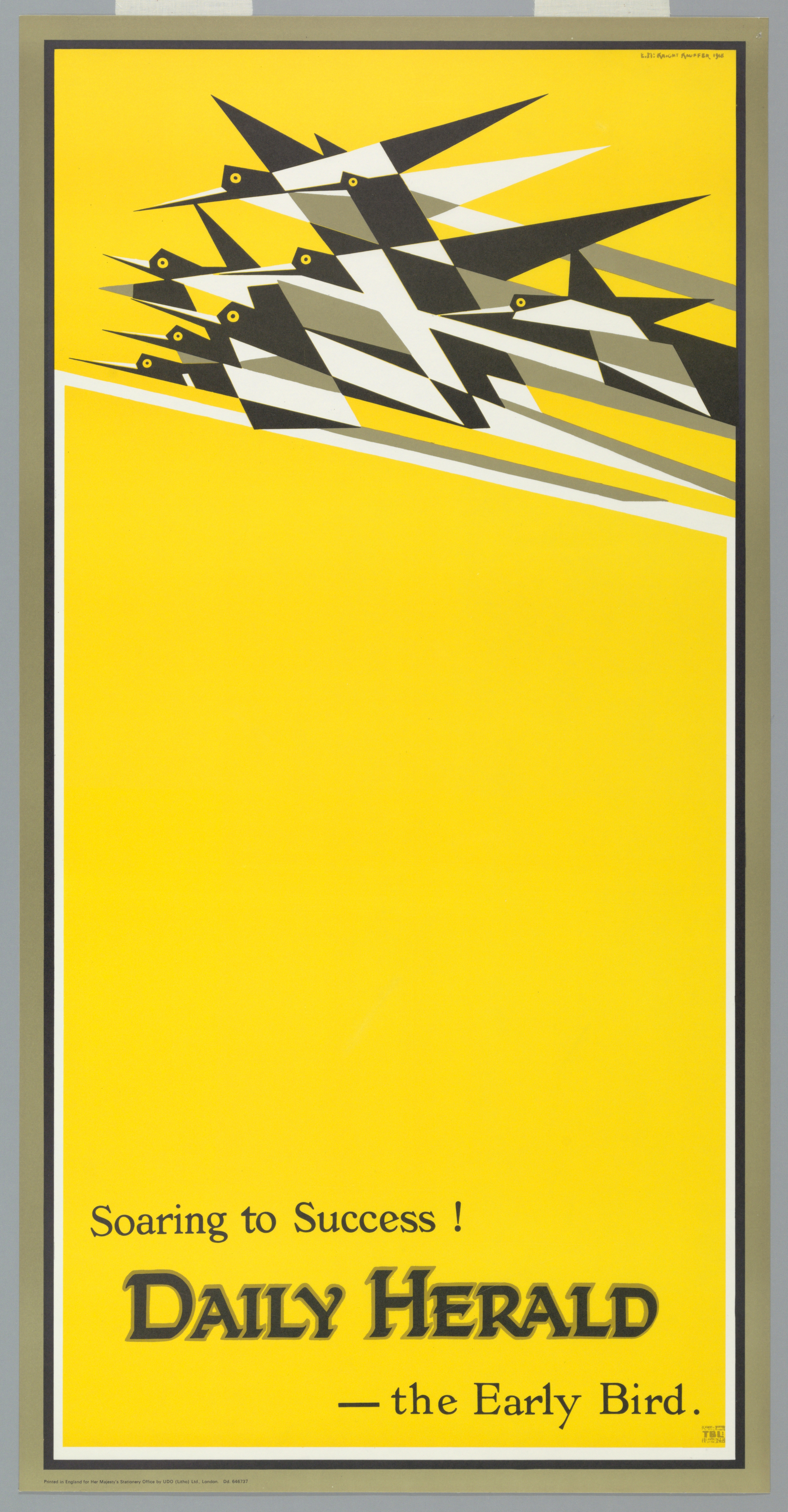
Variant of the poster Soaring to Success: The Early Bird, for the Daily Herald (1918)

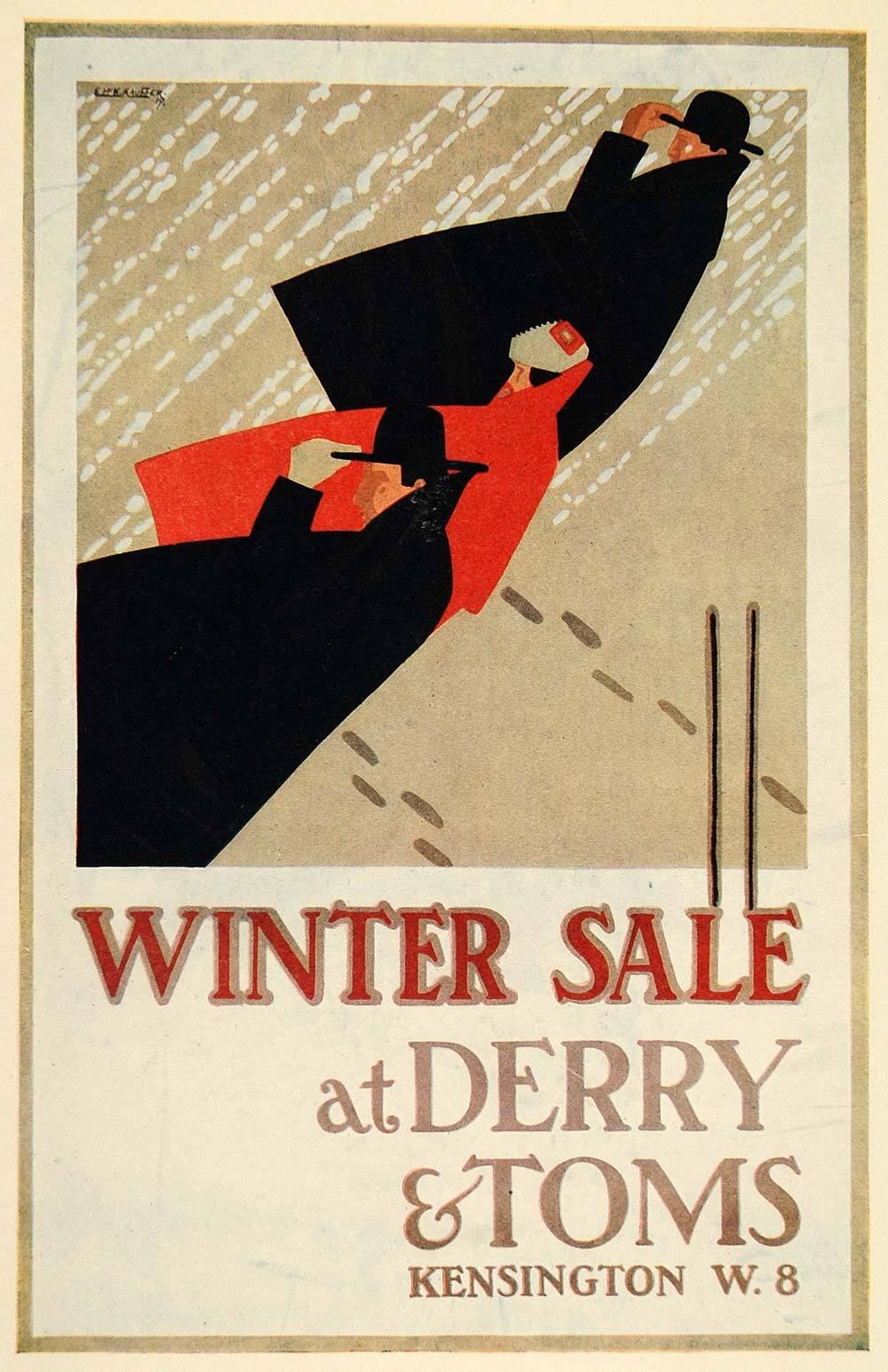
Poster, Winter Sale at Derry & Toms (1919)

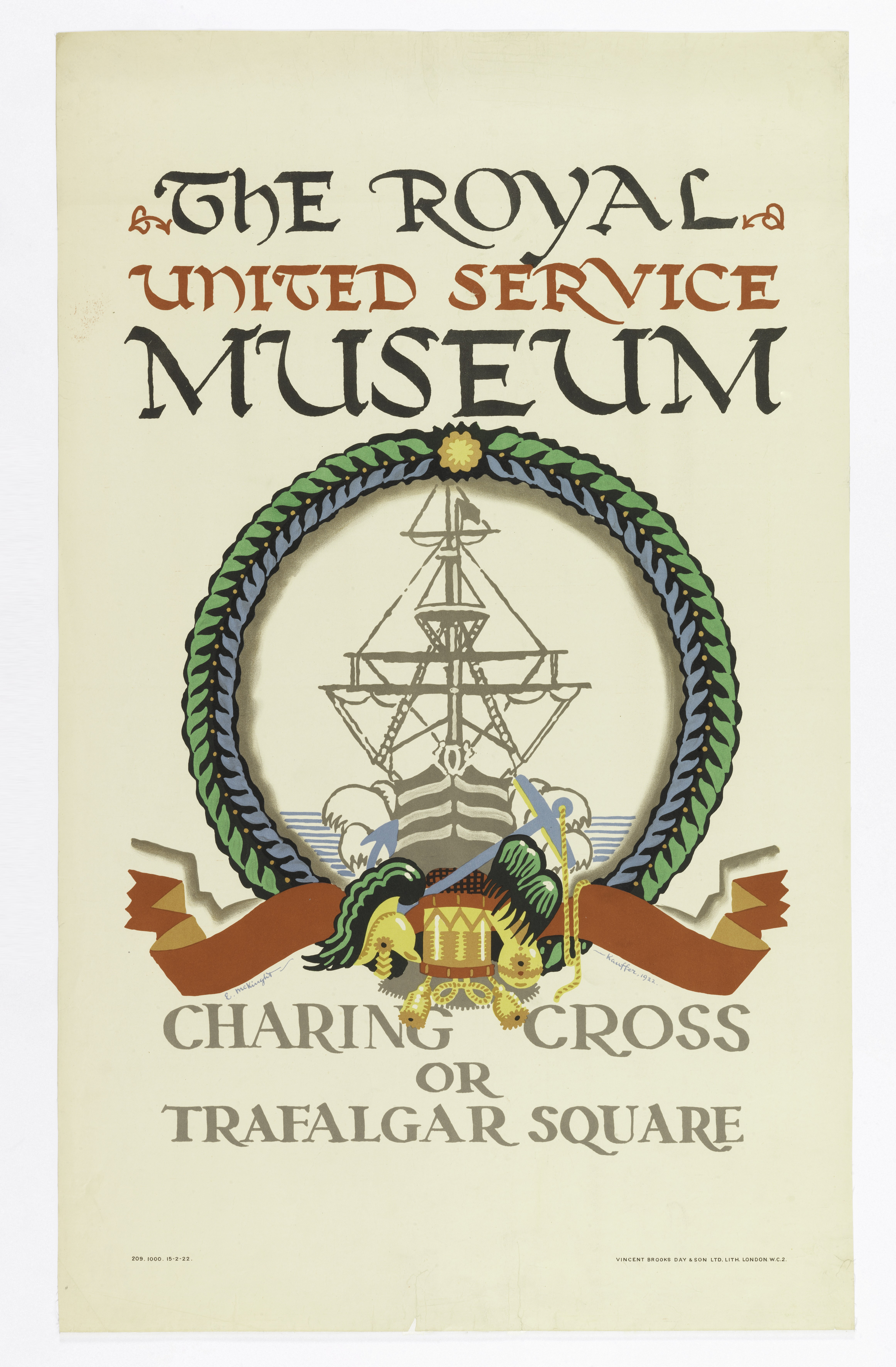
Poster, The Royal United Service Museum, for London Underground (1921)

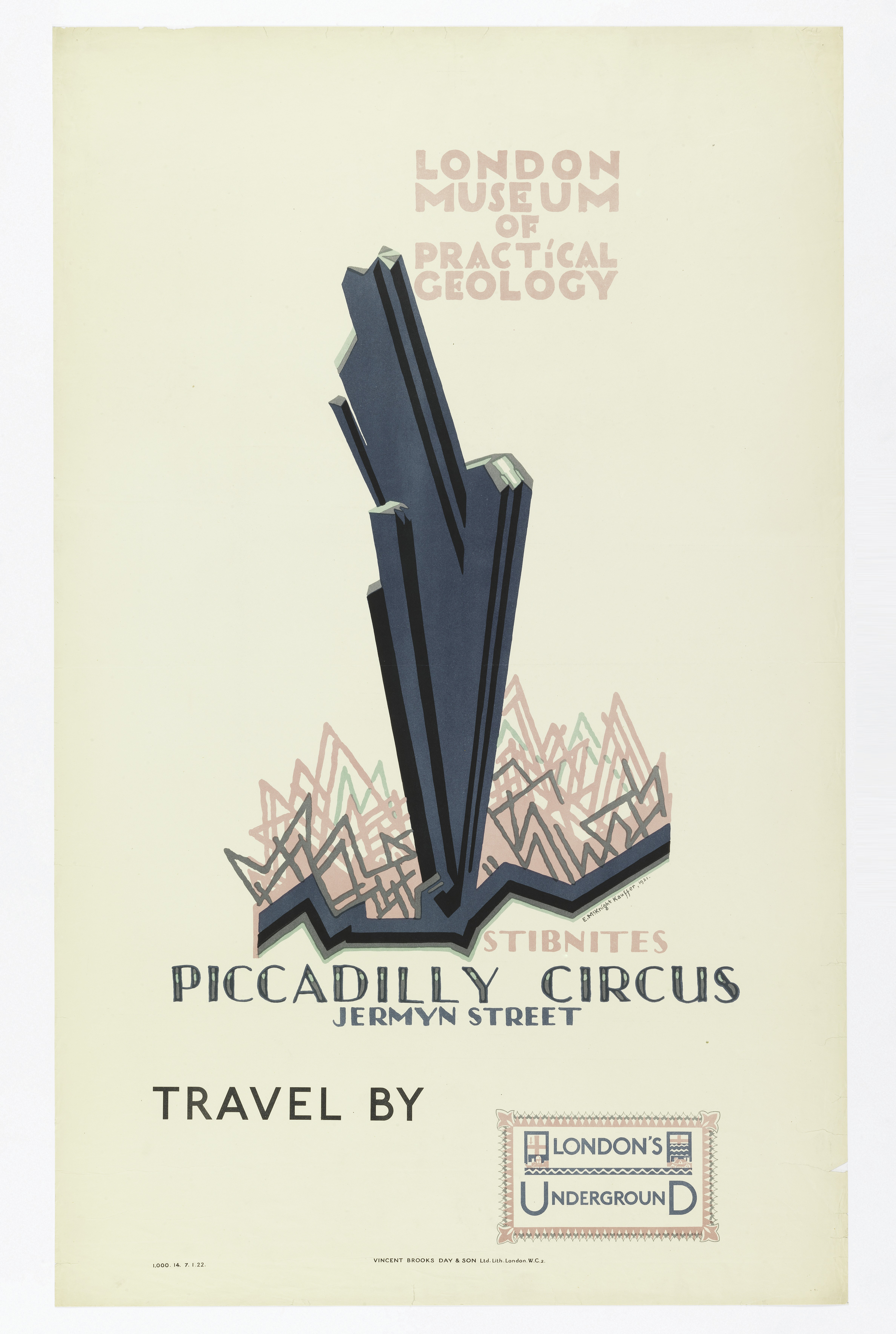
Poster, Museum of Practical Geology, for London Underground (1921)

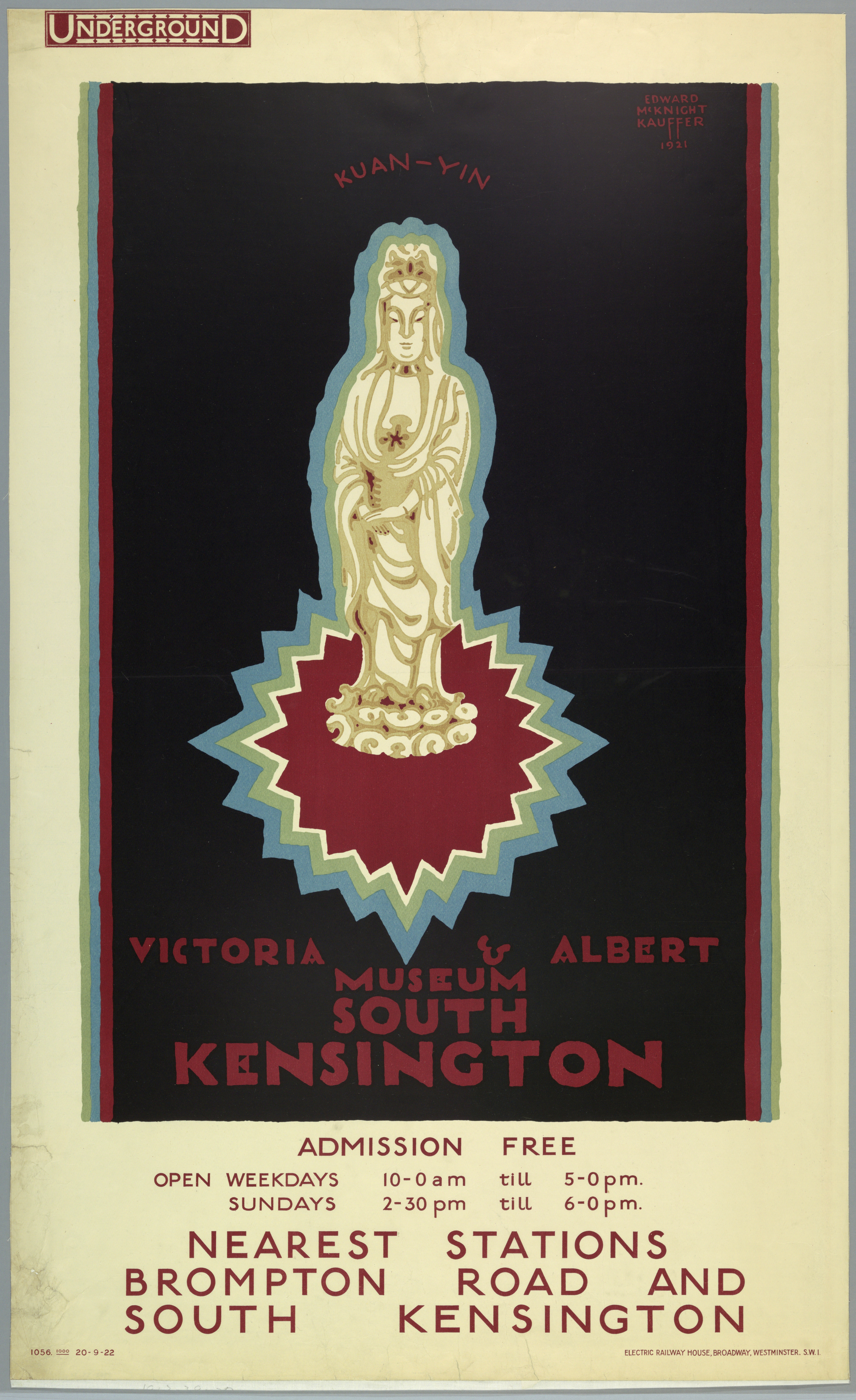
Poster, Victoria and Albert Museum, for London Underground (1921)

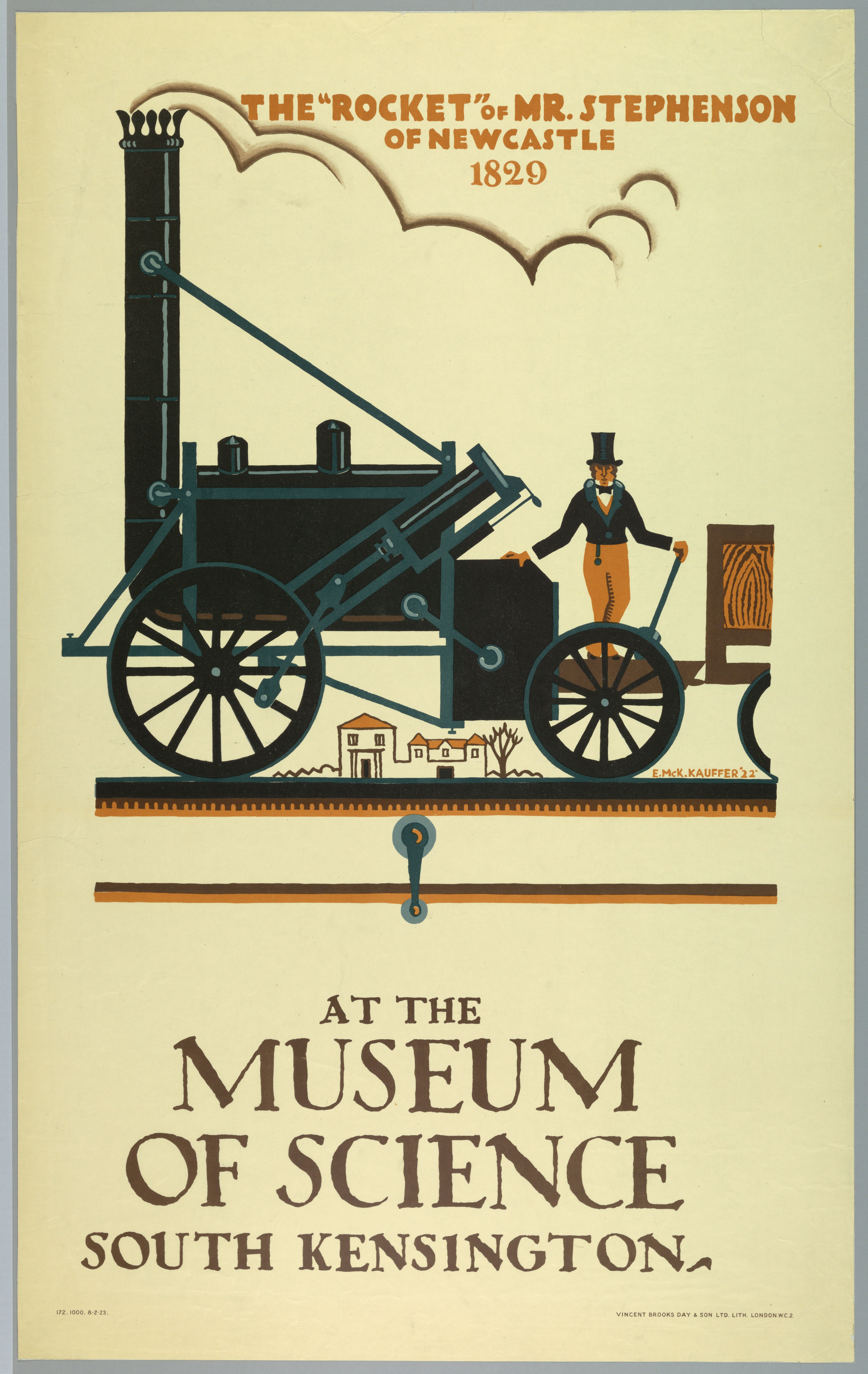
Poster, The 'Rocket', for the Science Museum (1922)

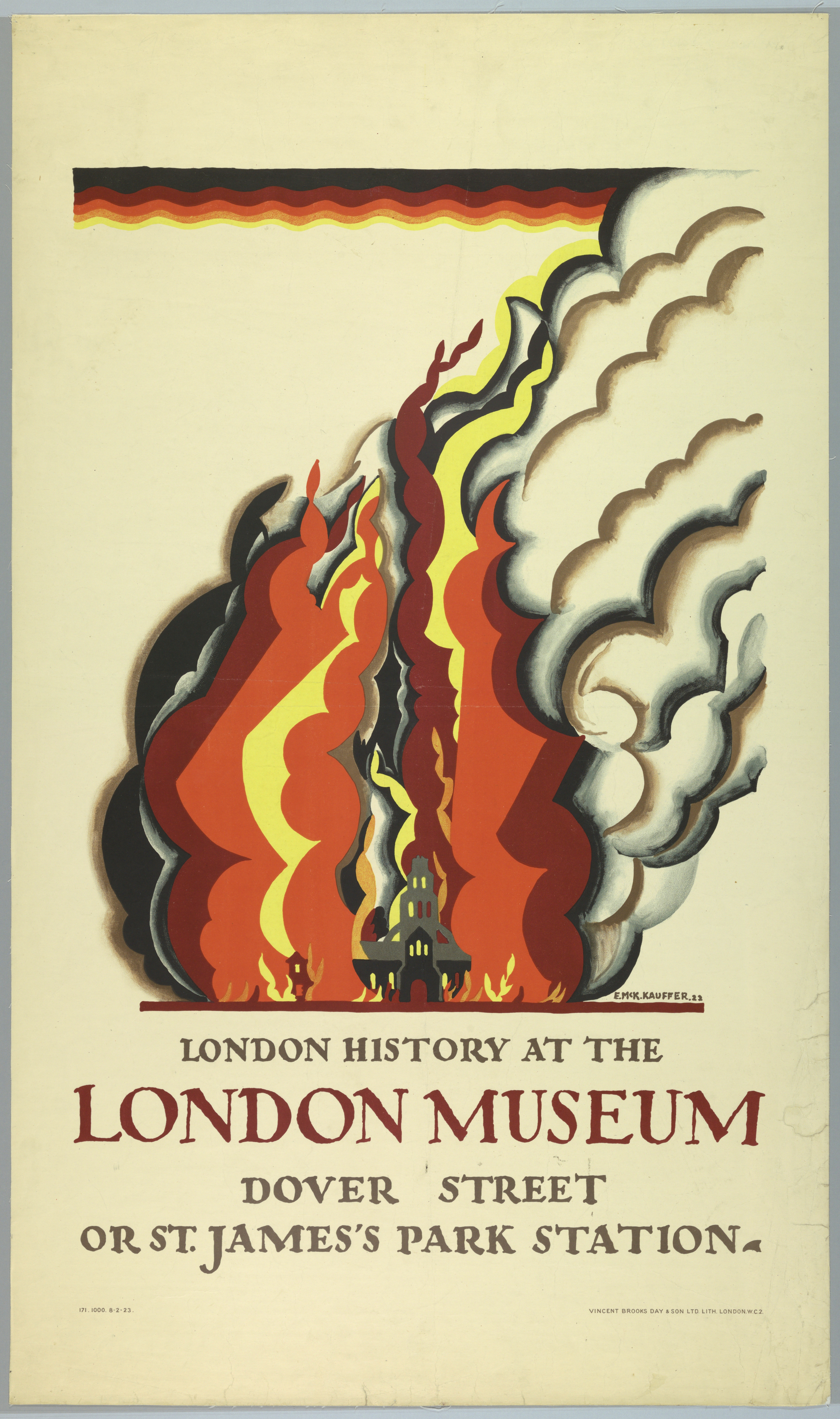
Poster, London History at the London Museum, for London Underground (1922)

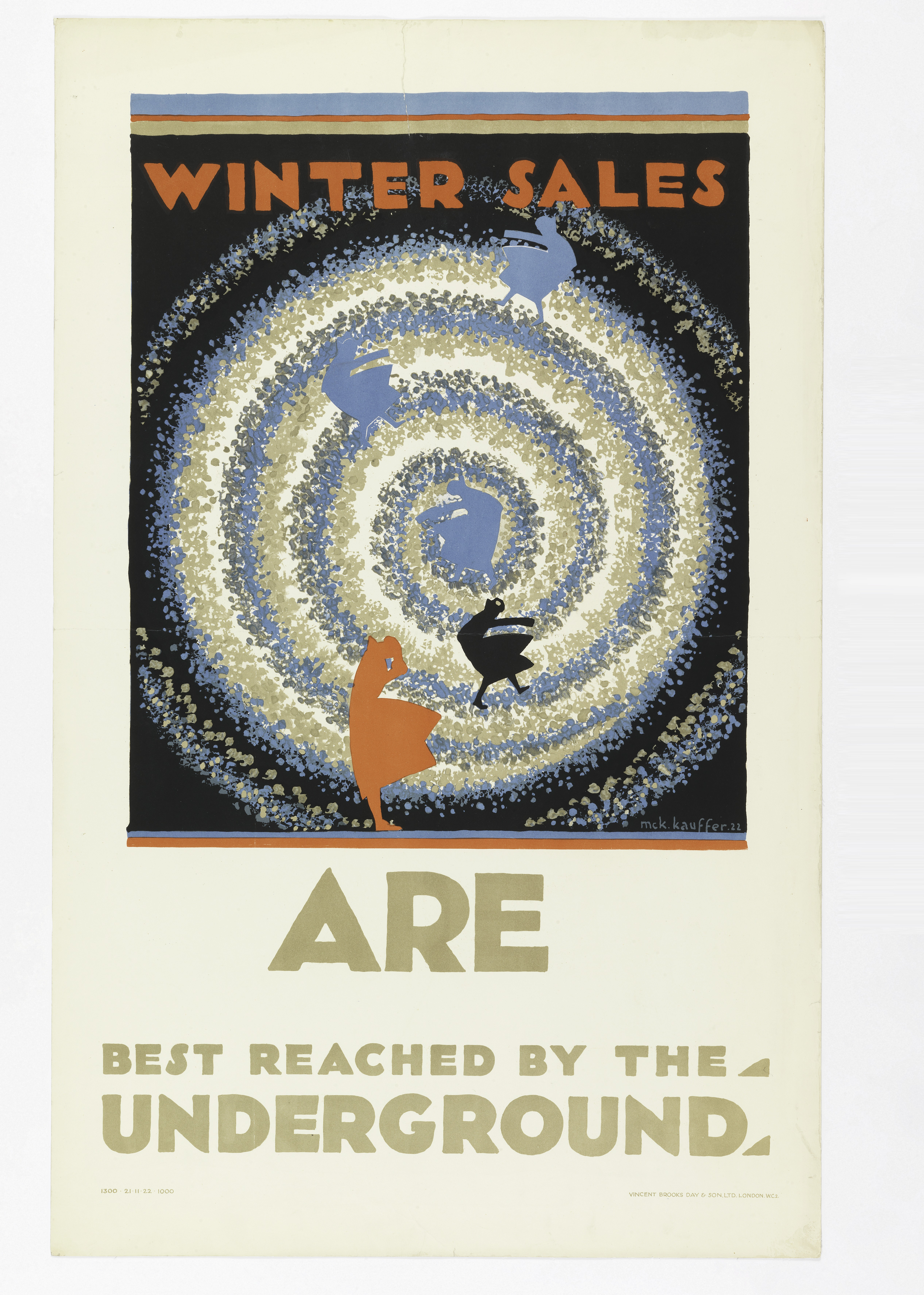
Poster, Winter Sales, for London Underground (1922)

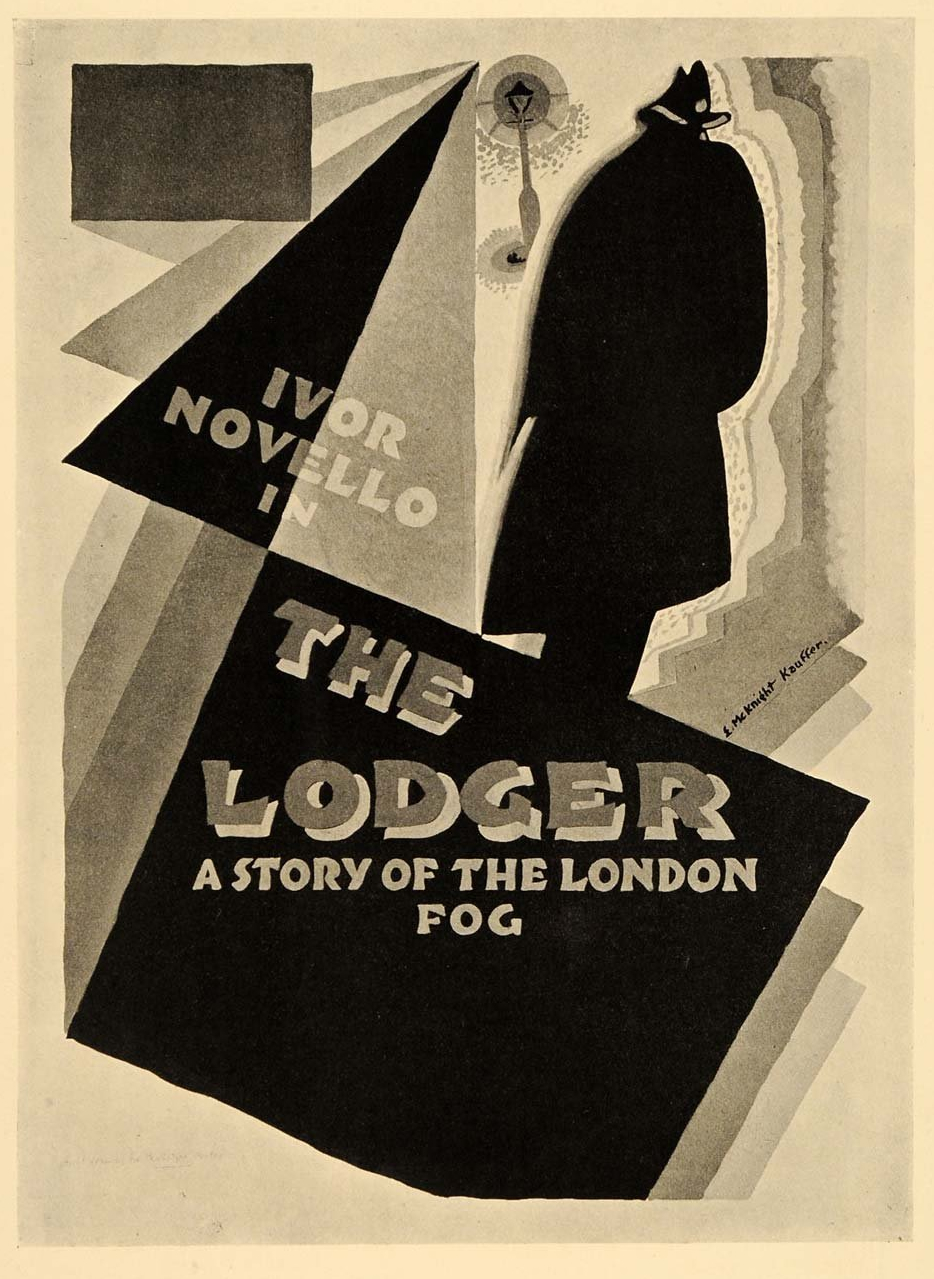
Poster for the film The Lodger (1927)

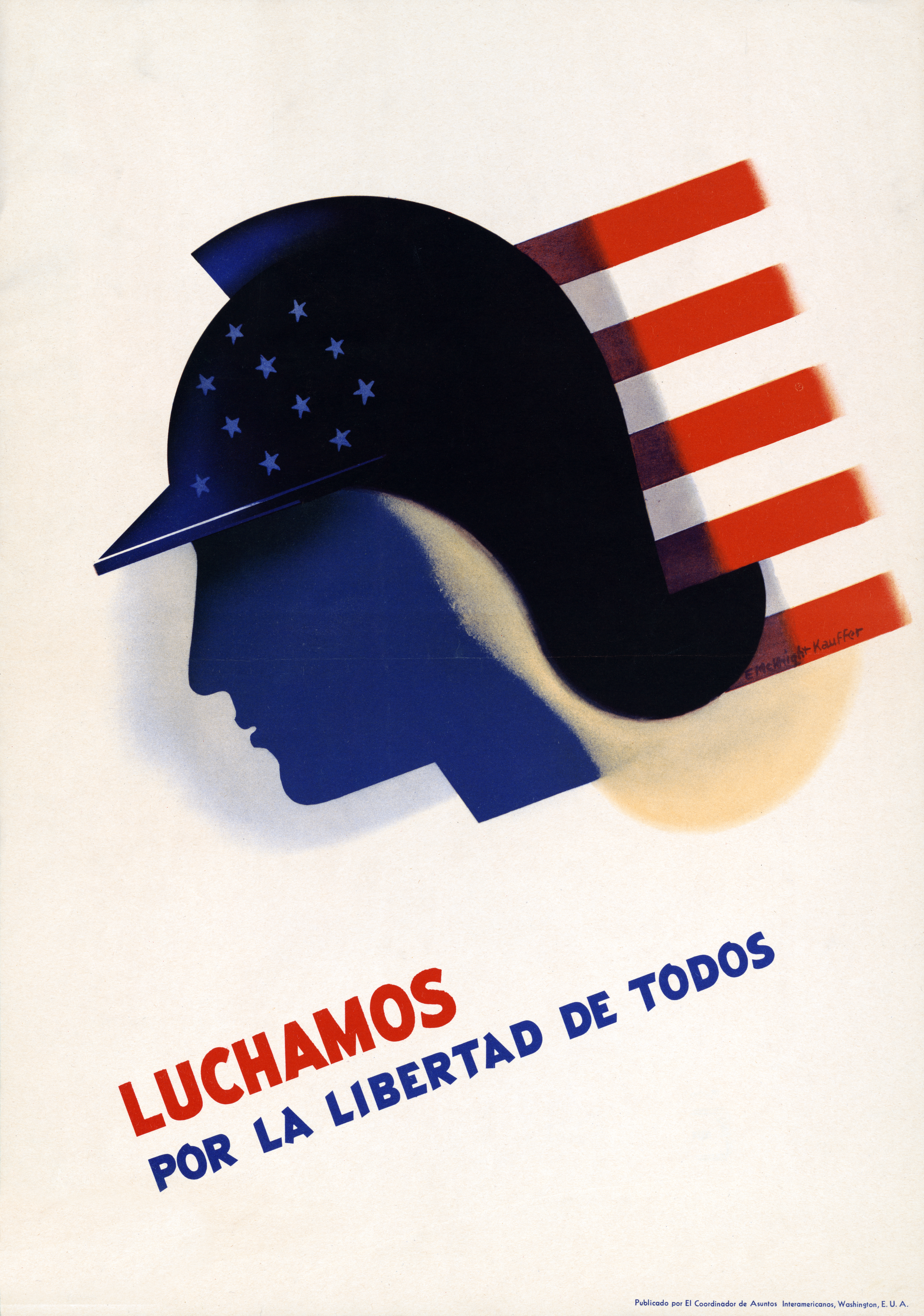
Poster for the Office of the Coordinator of Inter-American Affairs, (c. 1941)

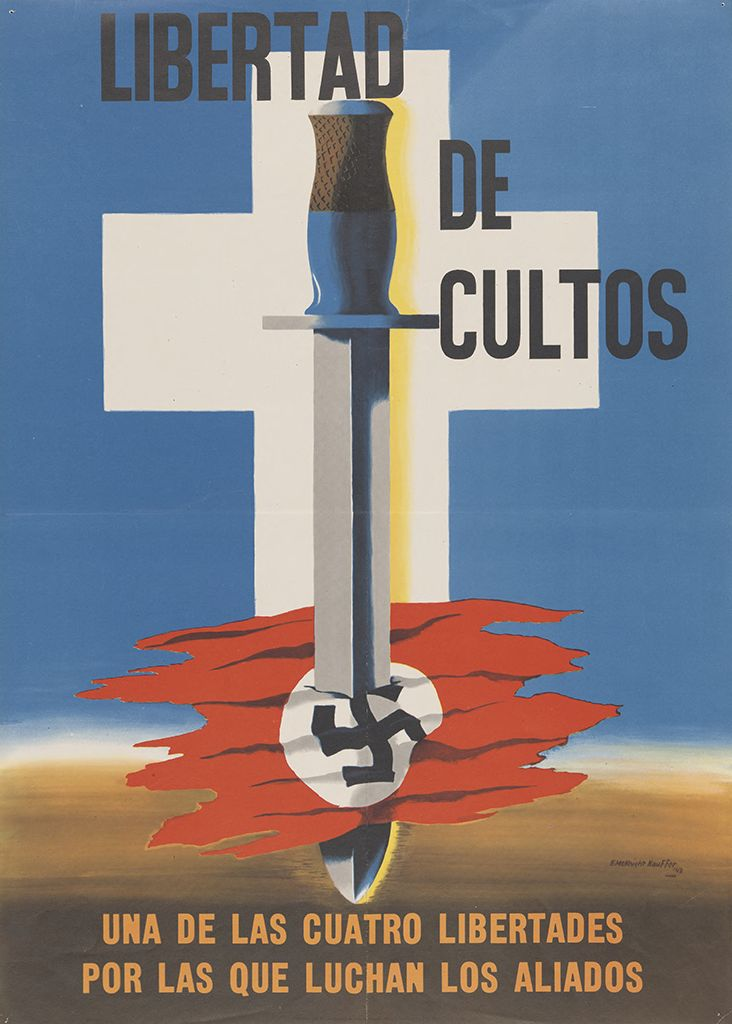
Poster, Libertad de cultos (Freedom of Worship) (1942)

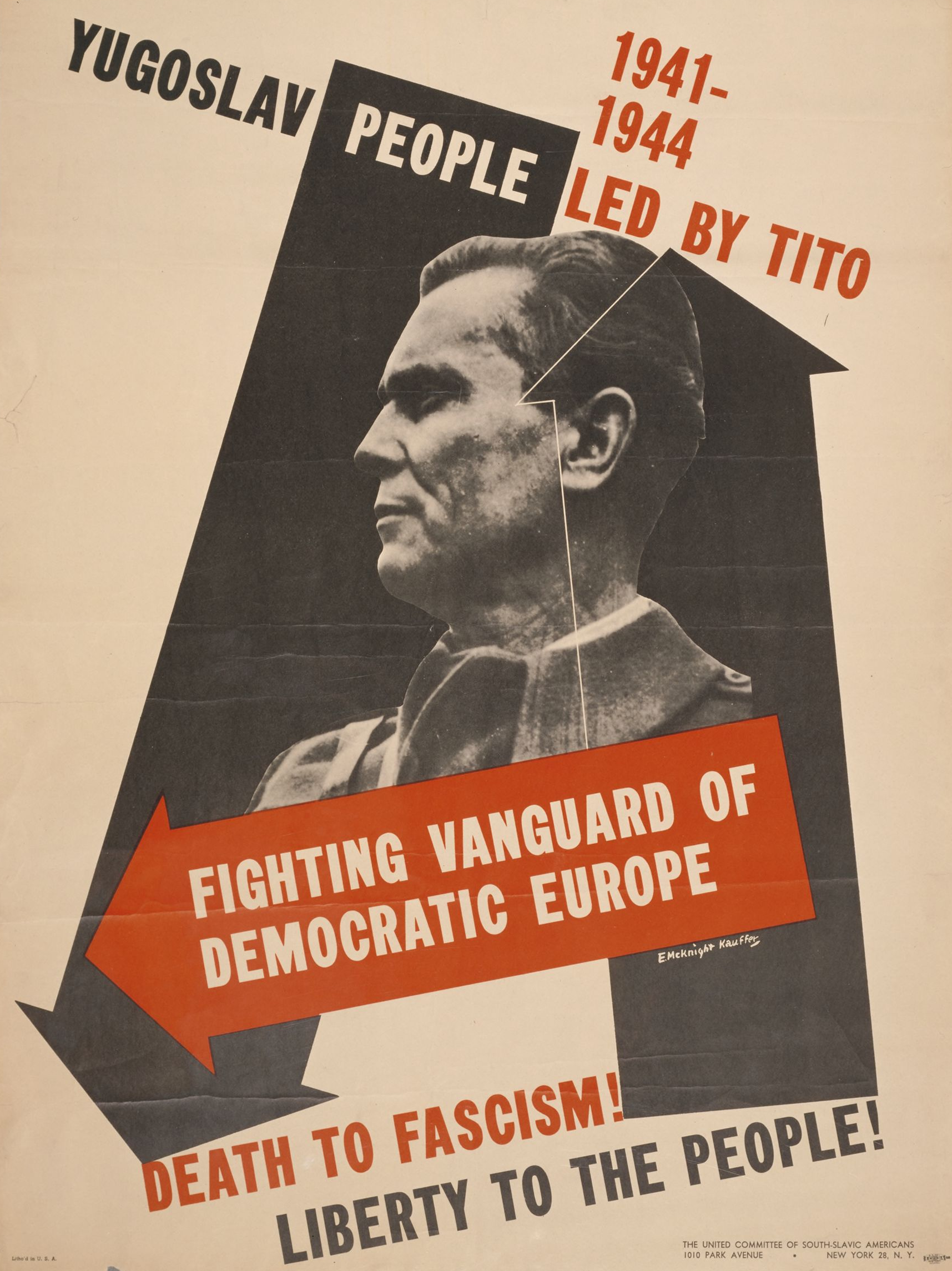
Poster for the United Committee of South-Slavic Americans (c. 1944)

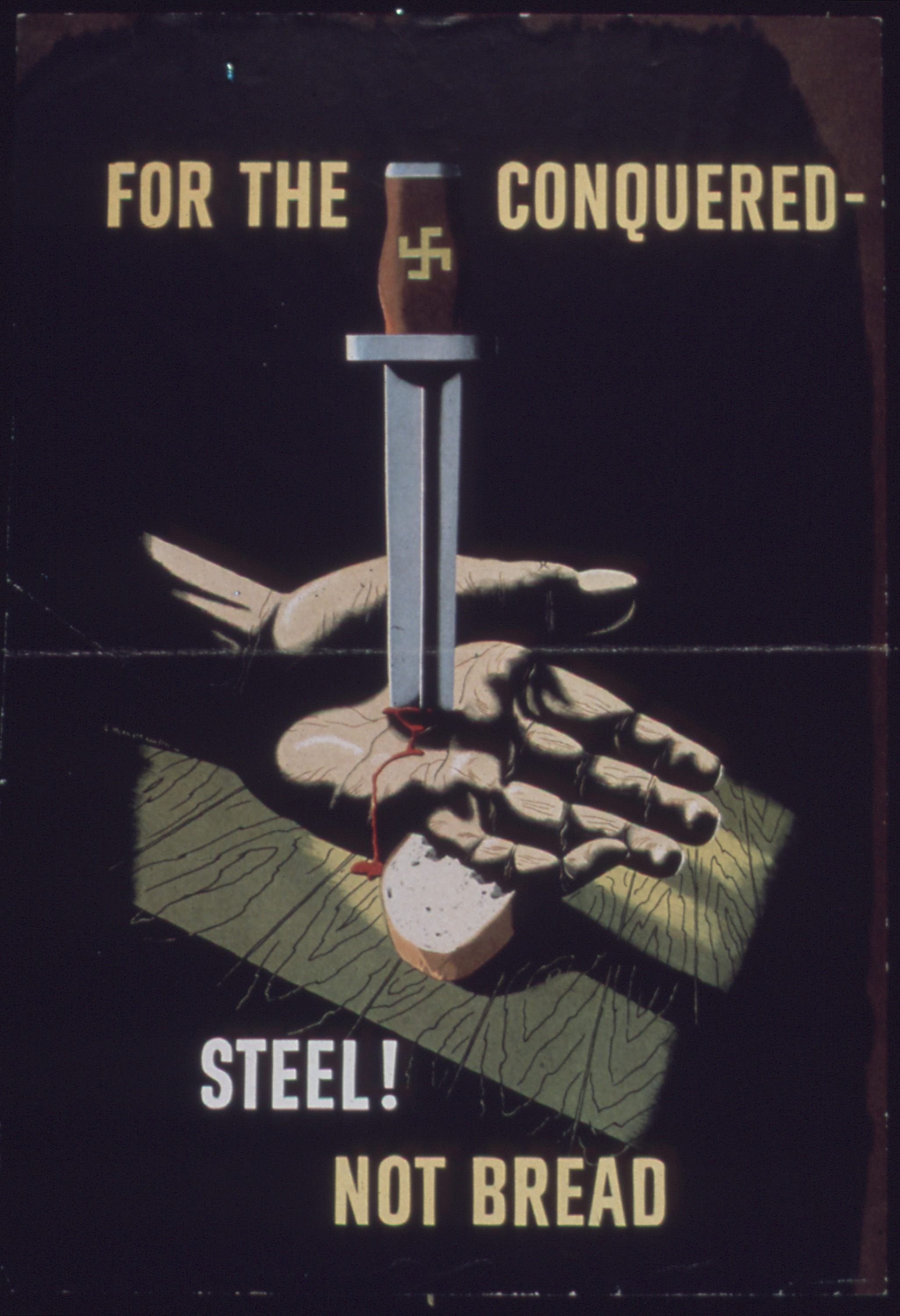
Poster, For the Conquered - Steel! Not Bread, for the Office for Emergency Management, (c. 1941–1945)

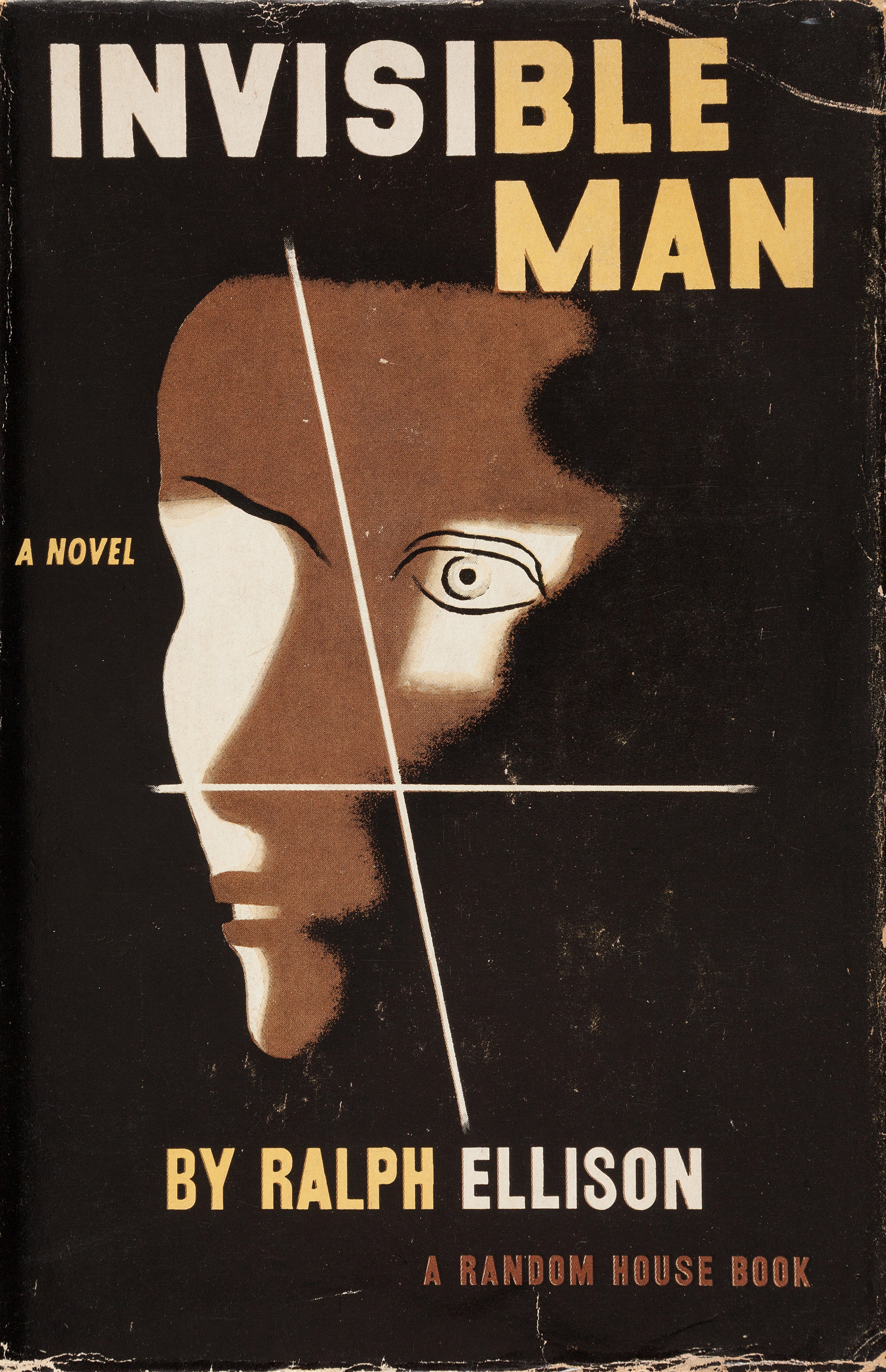
Dust jacket for Invisible Man (1952)
