= The Frontiers of Criticism =

1956 lecture by T. S. Eliot

"The Frontiers of Criticism" is a lecture given by T. S. Eliot at the University of Minnesota in 1956. It was reprinted in On Poetry and Poets, a collection of Eliot's critical essays, in 1957. The essay is an attempt by Eliot to define the boundaries of literary criticism: to say what does, and what does not, constitute truly literary criticism, as opposed to, for example, a study in history based upon a work of literature. The essay is significant because it represents Eliot's response to the New Critical perspective which had taken the academic study of literature by storm during Eliot's lifetime. It also presents an analysis of some of its author's own poetic works, an unusual characteristic for modern criticism—it has become far more usual today for poets and critics to be in separate camps, rather than united in one individual. Perhaps even more importantly, it demonstrates the progress and change in Eliot's own critical thought over the years between 1919 and 1956.

== Background ==
=== Prior critical work ===
Part of the reason for the importance of this particular piece in Eliot's body of work is the position it holds as successor to an earlier (and probably better known) effort at defining the critical endeavour, Tradition and the Individual Talent. In that earlier piece (first published in 1919), Eliot made famous use of a metaphor drawn from chemistry to describe the process of "depersonalization" that Eliot claimed to be a necessary condition of poetic creation. In this analogy, Eliot compares the poet him- or herself to a catalyst, whose presence causes "feelings" and "emotions" to react with one another and combine in ways not possible without the poet's mind.

The essay also makes the point that "No poet, no artist of any art, has his complete meaning alone. His significance, his appreciation is the appreciation of his relation to the dead poets and artists. . . . The existing [literary] monuments form an ideal order among themselves, which is modified by the introduction of the new (the really new) work of art among them." Eliot contended that while art never actually got better, it was in a continual state of flux.

=== Eliot and New Criticism ===
Eliot is often claimed by the New Critics as one of their founding fathers, an "honor" he rejected for much the same reasons that he avoided explicit theorising on the subject of literature: namely, because of his conception of the only true criticism as that of a poet trying to better his art. In some of his work, Eliot had espoused the idea of criticism as necessarily impersonal.

The evaluation of Eliot's criticism occurred relatively early; for example, an appraisal of his work focusing exclusively on Eliot the critic (as opposed to Eliot the poet) appeared in 1941 in a book by John Crowe Ransom. Ransom, participating in the New Critical tradition of borrowing from Eliot, writes that

One of the best things in his influence has been his habit of considering aesthetic effect as independent of religious effect, or moral, or political and social; as an end that is beyond and not co-ordinate with these.

This is quite similar to the New Critical attitudes of such authors as W. K. Wimsatt and Monroe Beardsley. In their theories of literary criticism, it is of vital importance to separate the work in question from all other factors, both on the side of creation (i.e., the writer's intentions) and on that of consumption (the reader's reactions).

== Content of the lecture ==
Eliot's paper is a concise statement of his reactions to the new directions that literary criticism had taken in the years since the publication in 1923 of his article "The Function of Criticism." In this way, the paper is also a more mature re-evaluation of his own positions. Much of its length is involved in this kind of self-study, both of his earlier critical work as well as of his poetry.

=== Influences on later critics ===
Throughout, the essay demonstrates the influences Eliot had on the New Critics. While Eliot states early on that he failed to see why he was deemed by current literary scholarship to have given birth to New Criticism (106), he also uses the essay as a platform from which to proclaim a number of principles that are quite similar to those of the New Critics:

- the idea of the circumstances surrounding a work's creation as irrelevant (112)
- the "danger . . . of assuming that there must be just one interpretation of the poem as a whole, [and] that it must be right" (113)
- the lack of a need to assess the author's intent (113–14)
- the unimportance of the "feelings" of the reader (114)
- the limitation of literary criticism to the study of the literary object, i.e., the work itself (116)

However, at the same time, Eliot takes the opportunity to disavow that school of criticism. He ridicules one of the methods of New Criticism, known today as close reading, describing it thus:

The method is to take a well-known poem . . . without reference to the author or to his other work, analyse it stanza by stanza and line by line, and extract, squeeze, tease, press every drop of meaning out of it that one can. It might be called the lemon-squeezer school of criticism. . . . I imagine that some of the poets (they are all dead except myself) would be surprised at learning what their poems mean . . . (113)

Eliot is here giving voice to one of the most common objections to New Criticism, namely that it removes all the enjoyment from a work of literature by dissecting it. This essay strongly asserts that enjoyment is an important component of the reading of literature. Eliot makes no distinction between "enjoyment and understanding," seeing the two not "as distinct activities—one emotional and the other intellectual. . . . To understand a poem comes to the same thing as to enjoy it for the right reasons" (115). On the whole question of enjoyment, Eliot diverges from the general trend of New Criticism, which primarily concerned itself with interpretation. Eliot further distances himself from the New Critics with his implication of the possibility of misunderstanding a poem (115), an idea that the New Critics would consider heretical.

=== Difference between understanding and explanation ===
A large part of this lecture is devoted to Eliot's critique of what he calls "the criticism by explanation of origins" (107). One of these is The Road to Xanadu, by John Livingston Lowes, a work that is now virtually unknown. The other, however, is James Joyce's Finnegans Wake, a work composed mostly what Eliot refers to as "merely beautiful nonsense" (109) that has puzzled critics since its publication.

These works provide Eliot a springboard from which to launch an "analysis" of his own poems. He takes an amused tone when describing his feelings on hearing what some readers have thought about his various works, with primary reference to The Waste Land. Eliot discusses the process by which the notes to that poem came to be, saying that, to his regret, "They have had almost greater popularity than the poem itself" (110). Eliot uses the example of Finnegans Wake to illuminate the distinction between explanation and understanding.

=== Definition of literary criticism ===
Eliot, like the New Critics, distinguishes among types or classes of criticism, isolating (as the lecture's title suggests) a certain area for literary criticism. Also like the New Critics, he allows that there is merit to such studies. He credits Coleridge with bringing other disciplines (e.g., philosophy, psychology) into the field of literary study. Eliot defines specifically literary criticism as criticism written in order

to help his [i.e., the critic's] readers to understand and enjoy [a work of literature]. ...

We can therefore ask, about any writing which is offered to us as literary criticism, is it aimed towards understanding and enjoyment? If it is not, it may still be a legitimate and useful activity; but it is to be judged as a contribution to psychology, or sociology, or logic, or pedagogy, or some other pursuit—and it is to be judged by specialists, not by men of letters. (116–17)

The argument of the essay is for a strongly individualist criticism, made clear by the frequent references to the author's own works. "The best of my literary criticism . . . consists of essays on poets and poetic dramatists who had influenced me" (106). In this, Eliot has something in common with the style of literary criticism expounded by Matthew Arnold, known for its emphasis on reading to make oneself a better writer.
