= The Waste Land =

1922 poem by T. S. Eliot

- by T. S. Eliot
- Title page of the first book edition (December 1922)
- First published in: The Criterion (UK); The Dial (US)
- Country: United Kingdom
- Publication date: 16 October 1922 (UK); c. 20 October 1922 (US)
- Lines: 434 (Note: There is a discrepancy between the line numbers in the first edition and some subsequent editions. The first edition gives a total of 433 lines, which is often cited as the poem's length, but other sources give a length of 434 lines. 434-line editions count "From doors of mudcracked houses / If there were water" as lines 345–346, whereas 433-line editions count it as a single dropped line; this is possibly simply a counting error. cf. Eliot 1961, p. 54; Eliot 1922, p. 42)

Full text
- The Waste Land at Wikisource

The Waste Land is a poem by T. S. Eliot, widely regarded as one of the most important English-language poems of the 20th century and a central work of modernist poetry. Published in 1922, the 434-line poem first appeared in the United Kingdom in the October issue of Eliot's magazine The Criterion and in the United States in the November issue of The Dial. Among its famous phrases are "April is the cruellest month", "I will show you fear in a handful of dust", and "These fragments I have shored against my ruins".

The Waste Land does not follow a single narrative or feature a consistent style or structure. The poem shifts between voices of satire and prophecy, and features abrupt and unannounced changes of narrator, location, and time, conjuring a vast and dissonant range of cultures and literatures. It employs many allusions to the Western canon: Ovid's Metamorphoses, the legend of the Fisher King, Dante's Divine Comedy, Chaucer's Canterbury Tales, and even a contemporary popular song, "That Shakespearian Rag".

The poem is divided into five sections. The first, "The Burial of the Dead", introduces the diverse themes of disillusionment and despair. The second, "A Game of Chess", employs alternating narrations in which vignettes of several characters display the fundamental emptiness of their lives. "The Fire Sermon" offers a philosophical meditation in relation to self-denial and sexual dissatisfaction; "Death by Water" is a brief description of a drowned merchant; and "What the Thunder Said" is a culmination of the poem's previously exposited themes explored through a description of a desert journey.

Upon its initial publication The Waste Land received a mixed response, with some critics finding it wilfully obscure while others praised its originality. Subsequent years saw the poem become established as a central work in the modernist canon, and it proved to become one of the most influential works of the century.

== History ==
=== Background ===
While at Harvard College Eliot met Emily Hale, the daughter of a minister at Harvard Divinity School, through family friends. He declared his love for her before leaving to live in Europe in 1914, but he did not believe his feelings to be reciprocated. Her influence is felt in The Waste Land, and he would renew his correspondence with her in 1927.

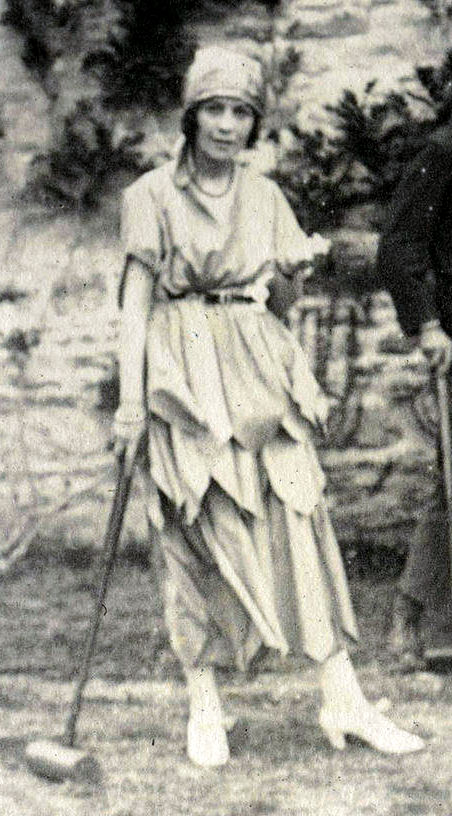
Vivienne Eliot (Note: Haigh-Wood abbreviated her first name to Vivien, and after marriage she took Eliot's surname, becoming Vivien Eliot. This article refers to her as Vivienne Haigh-Wood before marriage. After marriage, it refers to her as Vivienne Eliot, or simply Vivienne, to avoid confusion, following the example of Rainey 1991 and Mayer 1991.) in 1921

Eliot married his first wife Vivienne Haigh-Wood in 1915, having been introduced to her earlier that year by Scofield Thayer. She had a history of mental illness, and it is not clear to what extent Eliot knew about this before the wedding. The marriage had a shaky start: Eliot appears to have had certain neuroses concerning sex and sexuality, perhaps indicated by the women featured in his poetry, and there is speculation that the two were not sexually compatible. In late 1915 Vivienne began to suffer from "nerves" or "acute neuralgia", an illness which undoubtedly bore a mental component. Their friend Bertrand Russell took her to the seaside town of Torquay to recuperate; Eliot took Russell's place after a week, and the couple walked the shore, which Eliot found tranquil. Once back in London, Vivienne was left bored and unoccupied while Eliot worked fourteen or fifteen hours a day, and in 1918 she had a brief affair with Russell; it is not known if Eliot was aware of this. Eliot himself, under strain from his heavy workload, concern about his father's health, and the stress of the ongoing war, was also suffering from poor health, to the extent that his doctor had ordered him not to write prose for six months. In the succeeding years both experienced periods of depression, with Eliot being constantly exhausted and Vivienne experiencing migraines. In 1921 Eliot was diagnosed with a nervous disorder and prescribed three months of rest, a period that precipitated the writing of The Waste Land.

Eliot had worked as a schoolteacher from 1915 to 1916, resigning to make a living from lecturing and literary reviews. He was obliged, however, to take a job at Lloyds Bank in March 1917, earning a salary of £270 in 1918 for a role interpreting the balance sheets of foreign banks. He would work at the bank for the next nine years. He began to work as an assistant editor of literary magazine The Egoist on the side, his salary of £9 per quarter partly financed by John Quinn, Ezra Pound's patron. Eliot also began to write on a freelance basis for The Athenaeum and The Times Literary Supplement in 1919, which built his reputation as a respected critic and journalist.

While living in London Eliot became acquainted with literary figures, most notably Pound in 1914, who would help publish Eliot's work and edit The Waste Land. Eliot also met Aldous Huxley and Katherine Mansfield, as well as members of the Bloomsbury Group, in London in 1916, although he did not meet Leonard and Virginia Woolf until two years later.

Eliot's first collection, Prufrock and Other Observations, was published in 1917 thanks to the efforts of Pound. Publishers were not confident in its success, and it was published by Harriet Shaw Weaver of The Egoist only with funding provided by Pound's wife Dorothy, although Eliot was unaware of this arrangement. It generated very little interest until after the publication of The Waste Land, and did not sell its initial run of 500 copies until 1922. Poems was published in 1919 by the Woolfs' Hogarth Press, again having been turned down by several other publishers. By 1920 Eliot had established himself as a reputed critic, and the publication of Ara Vos Prec and the US publication of Poems generated notable press coverage. His 1920 collection of essays, The Sacred Wood, met with mixed reviews, and Eliot felt it should have been revised further.

=== Writing ===
Eliot probably worked on the text that became The Waste Land for several years preceding its first publication in 1922. In 1919 he referred to "a long poem I have had on my mind for a long time" in a letter to his mother. In a May 1921 letter to New York lawyer and art patron John Quinn, Eliot wrote that he had "a long poem in mind and partly on paper which I am wishful to finish".

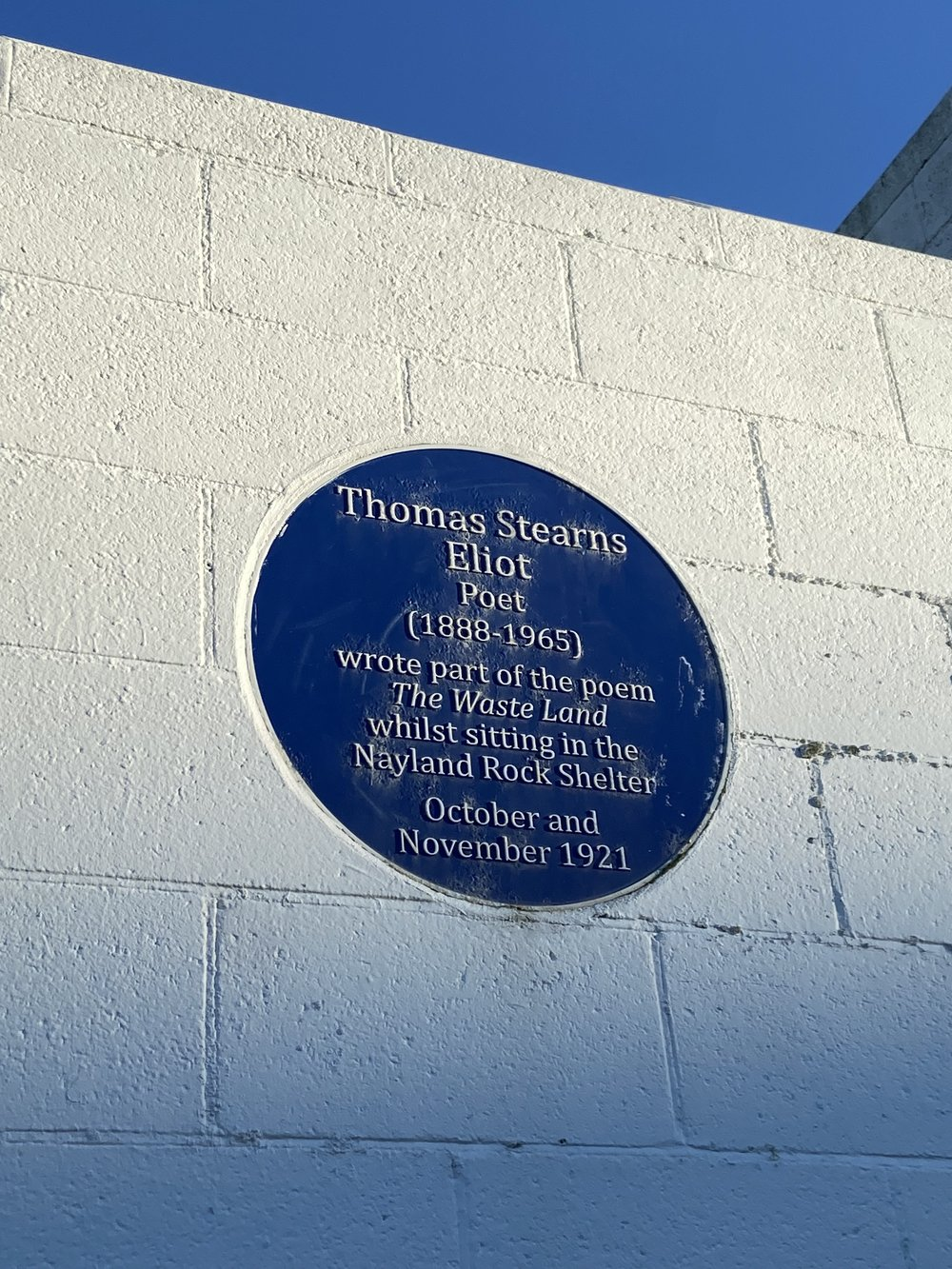
The blue plaque near the Nayland Rock shelter in Margate where Eliot wrote some of The Waste Land.

Richard Aldington, in his memoirs, relates that "a year or so" before Eliot read him the manuscript draft of The Waste Land in London, Eliot visited him in the country. While walking through a graveyard, they discussed Thomas Gray's Elegy Written in a Country Churchyard. Aldington writes: "I was surprised to find that Eliot admired something so popular, and then went on to say that if a contemporary poet, conscious of his limitations as Gray evidently was, would concentrate all his gifts on one such poem he might achieve a similar success."

In the autumn of 1921 Eliot and Vivienne travelled to the coastal resort of Margate. Eliot had been recommended rest following a diagnosis of some form of nervous disorder, and had been granted three months' leave from the bank where he was employed, so the trip was intended as a period of convalescence. Eliot worked on what would become The Waste Land while sitting in the Nayland Rock shelter on Margate Sands, producing "some 50 lines", and the area is referenced directly in "The Fire Sermon" ("On Margate Sands / I can connect / Nothing with nothing.") The couple travelled to Paris in November, where Eliot showed an early version of the poem to Pound. Pound had become acquainted with Eliot seven years previously, and had helped get some of Eliot's previous work published. Eliot was travelling on to Lausanne for treatment by Dr Roger Vittoz, who had been recommended to him by Ottoline Morrell; Vivienne was to stay at a sanatorium just outside Paris. While under Vittoz's care, Eliot completed the first draft of The Waste Land.

=== Editing ===
Ezra Pound, a major editor of the work

Eliot returned from Switzerland to Paris in early January 1922 with the 19-page draft version of the poem; his treatment with Dr Vittoz proved to have been very successful, at least in the short term. Eliot and Pound proceeded to edit the poem further, continuing after Eliot returned to London. The editing process removed a large amount of content. Eliot allowed Pound a high degree of control over the shape and contents of the final version, deferring to his judgement on matters such as using Eliot's previous poem "Gerontion" as a prelude, or using an excerpt from the death of Kurtz in Conrad's Heart of Darkness as the epigraph (Pound rejected both of these ideas). Biographer Peter Ackroyd considers Pound's focus to have been on "the underlying rhythm of the poem ... Pound heard the music, and cut away what was for him the extraneous material which was attached to it." By removing much of Eliot's material, Pound allowed for readers to more freely interpret it as a less structured and didactic work, and his edits are generally considered to have been beneficial.

Vivienne also reviewed drafts of The Waste Land. The section "A Game of Chess" partly depicts scenes from the Eliots' marriage, although at her request a specific line was removed – "The ivory men make company between us" – perhaps because she found the depiction of their unhappy marriage too painful. In 1960, thirteen years after Vivienne's death, Eliot inserted the line from memory into a fair copy made for sale to aid the London Library.

In a late December 1921 letter to Eliot to celebrate the "birth" of the poem, Pound wrote a bawdy poem of 48 lines entitled "Sage Homme" in which he identified Eliot as the mother of the poem but compared himself to the midwife. The first lines are:

These are the poems of Eliot
By the Uranian Muse begot;
A Man their Mother was,
A Muse their Sire.
How did the printed Infancies result
From Nuptials thus doubly difficult?
If you must needs enquire
Know diligent Reader
That on each Occasion
Ezra performed the Caesarean Operation.

=== Publication ===
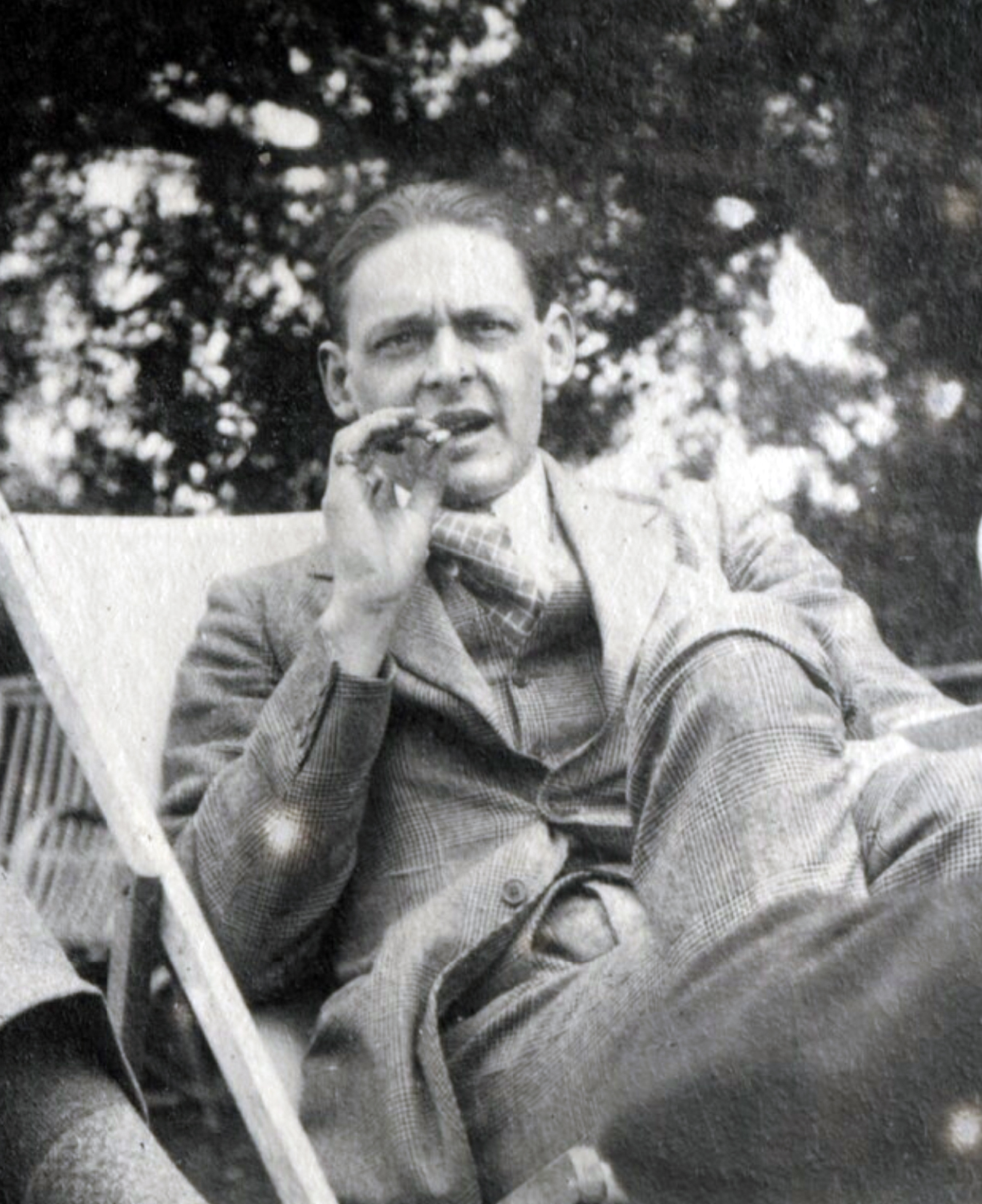
Eliot in 1923

Negotiations over the publication of The Waste Land started in January 1922 and lasted until the late summer. Horace Liveright, of the New York publishing firm of Boni & Liveright, had a number of meetings with Pound while in Paris, and at a dinner on 3 January 1922, with Pound, Eliot and James Joyce, he made offers for The Waste Land, Ulysses, and works by Pound. Eliot was to receive a royalty of 15% for a book version of the poem planned for autumn publication, although Liveright was concerned that the work was too short. Eliot was still under contract with his previous publisher Alfred Knopf, which gave Knopf the rights to Eliot's next two books, but in April Eliot managed to secure a release from that agreement.

Eliot also sought a deal with magazines. He had become friends with Scofield Thayer, editor of literary magazine The Dial, while at Milton Academy and Harvard College, and Eliot had offered the poem to Thayer for publication shortly after returning from Lausanne in January. Even though The Dial offered $150 (approx. £30–35) for the poem, 25% more than its standard rate, Eliot was offended that a year's work would be valued so low, especially since he knew that George Moore had been paid £100 for a short story. The deal with The Dial almost fell through (other magazines considered were The Little Review and Vanity Fair), but with Quinn's efforts eventually an agreement was reached where, in addition to the $150, Eliot would be awarded The Dial's second annual prize for outstanding service to letters, which carried an award of $2,000.

In New York, in late summer, Boni & Liveright made an agreement with The Dial allowing the magazine to be the first to publish the poem in the US, on the condition that they purchase 350 copies of the book at discount (increasing the cost to The Dial by $315). Eliot suggested that the "possibility of the book's getting the prize" might allow Boni & Liveright to use the publicity increase their initial sales.

The poem was first published in the UK in the first issue (16 October 1922) of Eliot's magazine The Criterion and in the US in the November issue of The Dial (actually published around 20 October). Eliot had initially suggested spreading the poem over four issues of The Dial, having doubts about its coherence as a single piece, and had considered publishing it across two issues of The Criterion in order to improve sales, but Pound objected. In December the Boni & Liveright book edition was published in the US, with an initial run of 1,000 copies and, very soon afterwards, a second edition, also of 1,000 copies. The first book edition was the first publication to print Eliot's accompanying notes, which he had added to pad the piece out and thereby address Liveright's concerns about its length. In September 1923, the Hogarth Press, a private press run by Eliot's friends Leonard and Virginia Woolf, published the first UK book edition of The Waste Land in a run of approximately 460 copies. Eliot, whose 1922 annual salary at Lloyds Bank was £500 ($2,215), made approximately £630 ($2,800) with The Dial, Boni & Liveright, and Hogarth Press publications.

Eliot sent the original manuscript drafts of the poem as a gift to John Quinn, believing it to be worthwhile to preserve the effects of Pound's editing; they arrived in New York in January 1923. Upon Quinn's death in 1924 they were inherited by his sister Julia Anderson, and for many years they were believed lost. In the early 1950s Mrs Anderson's daughter Mary Conroy found the documents in storage. In 1958 she sold them privately to the New York Public Library. It was not until April 1968, three years after Eliot's death, that the existence and whereabouts of the manuscript drafts were made known to Valerie Eliot, his second wife. In 1971 a facsimile of the original drafts was published, containing Pound's annotations, edited and annotated by Valerie Eliot.

=== Initial reception ===
The initial reviews of the poem were mixed. Some critics disparaged its disjointed structure, and suggested that its extensive use of quotations gave it a sense of unoriginality. F. L. Lucas wrote a particularly negative review in the New Statesman, stating that "Eliot has shown that he can at moments write real blank verse; but that is all"; The Guardian published a review calling it "waste paper", and the London Mercury considered it incomprehensible. William Carlos Williams considered it to have had a negative influence on American literature, writing that it had "set [him] back twenty years".

Gilbert Seldes, who first published the poem in the US, and Pound, its editor, both defended it, as did Conrad Aiken, who described it in a 1923 review as "one of the most moving and original poems of our time", although he found the form incoherent. Seldes commissioned a review from Edmund Wilson, which was positive, and other admirers included E. M. Forster and Cyril Connolly. Contemporary poets and young writers responded to the poem's modern style and content, a mini-phenomenon later described as "a cult of 'The Waste Landers'".

Subsequent reviews and criticism debated the value of some of Eliot's innovations. His notes and quotations were one source of disagreement: they were considered either "distracting or confusing if not pedantic and unpoetic", or "the very basis of a new and significant poetic technique". Similarly, the structure of the poem, or lack thereof, continued to generate debate, as did interpretations of the themes themselves. I. A. Richards praised Eliot on these points in his 1926 book Principles of Literary Criticism, describing his imagery technique as "a 'music of ideas'", and in the 1930s Richards' commentary was taken further by F. R. Leavis, F. O. Matthiessen and Cleanth Brooks, who believed that, despite its apparent disjointedness, the poem contains an underlying unity of form—for Leavis represented by the figure of Tiresias, and for Matthiessen and Brooks by the Grail mythology. This view became dominant for the next three decades.

== Contents ==
The Waste Land

=== Title ===
Eliot originally considered entitling the poem He Do the Police in Different Voices, and in the original manuscripts the first two sections of the poem appear under this title. This phrase is taken from Charles Dickens' novel Our Mutual Friend, in which the widow Betty Higden says of her adopted foundling son Sloppy: "You mightn't think it, but Sloppy is a beautiful reader of a newspaper. He do the Police in different voices." In the end, the title Eliot chose was The Waste Land. In his first note to the poem he attributes the title to Jessie Weston's book on the Grail legend, From Ritual to Romance (1920).

=== Structure ===
==== Epigraph and dedication ====
Did he live his life again in every detail of desire, temptation, and surrender during that supreme moment of complete knowledge? He cried in a whisper at some image, at some vision, – he cried out twice, a cry that was no more than a breath–

"'The horror! the horror!'"

— Joseph Conrad, Heart of Darkness
Eliot's original choice of epigraph.

The poem is preceded by a Latin and Ancient Greek epigraph (without translation) from chapter 48 of the Satyricon of Petronius:

Nam Sibyllam quidem Cumis ego ipse oculis meis vidi in ampulla pendere, et cum illi pueri dicerent: Σίβυλλα τί θέλεις; respondebat illa: άποθανεῖν θέλω.
With my own eyes I saw the Sibyl at Cumae hanging in a bottle and, when the attendants asked her what she wanted, she replied, "I want to die."

Eliot originally intended the epigraph to be a small section of Joseph Conrad's Heart of Darkness describing the death of the character Kurtz. Pound suggested it be changed as he felt Conrad was not "weighty" enough, although it is unclear if he was referring to the author or the quotation itself.

Following the epigraph is a dedication (added in a 1925 republication) that reads "For Ezra Pound: il miglior fabbro" ("the better craftsman"). This dedication was originally handwritten by Eliot in the 1922 Boni & Liveright edition of the poem presented to Pound; it was included in later editions. Eliot is quoting both Canto XXVI of Dante's Purgatorio and Pound's The Spirit of Romance (1910), which contains a chapter with the title "Il Miglior Fabbro" and which quotes that section of Purgatorio. Dante pays the troubadour Arnaut Daniel the same compliment through what Pound describes as "the device of praising Daniel by the mouth of Guinicelli". It is further explained in the 1910 work The Spirit of Romance that Dante is setting "the laudation in the mouth of his greatest Italian predecessor, Guido Guinicelli of Bologna". Pound observed that "Dante's poetry so overshadows his work in prose that we are apt to forget that he is numbered with Aristotle and Longinus among the great literary critics of past time". So, Eliot's epigraph praises Pound's critical and poetic skills by the mouth of Dante. The line "Poi s'ascose nel foco che gli affina" brings the reference to Arnaut Daniel in the dedication full circle; this is the final line of Canto 26 of Purgatorio, which describes Arnaut retreating into the purifying flames.

Eliot "wished his poem to go through English poetic styles as Joyce had gone through English prose styles", styles in turn derived from ancient sources. Daniel represents an important crossroads in the map of poetry in The Waste Land from the ancient to modern, sitting at the juncture between antiquity and modernity. "In the forms of Arnaut Daniel's canzoni I find a corresponding excellence, seeing that they satisfy not only the modern ear, gluttonous of rhyme, but also the ear trained to Roman and Hellenic music, to which rhyme seemed and seems a vulgarity".

==== I. The Burial of the Dead ====
The section title comes from the Anglican burial service in the Book of Common Prayer. It opens with a description of spring as something to be dreaded, with the comforting static nature of winter giving way to the forcible activity of spring. Eliot moves to the more specific location of Central Europe around the period of the First World War, and adopts a prophetic tone describing a sterile desert. Quotations from the operatic love story Tristan und Isolde bookend a memory of the "hyacinth girl", with the narrator trapped in a static existence between life and death, unable to profess his love. The scene then moves to the fortune-teller Madame Sosostris, who is described in ironically down-to-earth terms, and the Tarot cards she draws foretell events in the rest of the poem. The final part of "The Burial of the Dead" is a description of London as Dante's hell, with inhabitants trapped in a death-like state following a meaningless routine.

==== II. A Game of Chess ====
This section centres around women and seduction, with the title a reference to the Jacobean play Women Beware Women in which the character Bianca is seduced while her mother-in-law is distracted by a game of chess. Its first scene describes an elaborately decorated room recalling Classical lovers such as Mark Antony and Cleopatra or Dido and Aeneas. The narrative moves to more disturbing references, such as to Philomela who was raped and turned into a nightingale, and the poem depicts her as still suffering at the hands of an uncaring world. This moves to a conversation between an anxious woman and the thoughts of her husband, who does not reply—his thoughts are preoccupied with loss and death. The second part of the section is set in an East End pub and features a conversation between working-class Cockney women. They discuss childbearing, infidelity and abortion in a matter-of-fact manner, and appear to be trapped in loveless superficial relationships. The end of the section sees Eliot interleave the words of the barman calling last orders ("Hurry up please its [sic] time") and the last words of Ophelia in Hamlet before her suicide by drowning, signifying the inevitability of ageing and death.

==== III. The Fire Sermon ====
A reference to Edmund Spenser's poem Prothalamion, which describes an elegant aristocratic summer wedding by the River Thames, contrasts with the decaying and polluted modern state of the setting. Similarly the beautiful nymphs of the past have been replaced by prostitutes, and the washing of their feet in soda water is ironically contrasted with the washing of feet performed by choir boys in some tellings of the Fisher King legend. This is followed by a brief description of a dirty London and Mr Eugenides, the one-eyed Smyrna merchant foreseen by Madame Sosostris. The narrative then moves to a description of a loveless tryst between a typist and a "young man carbuncular", both acting mechanically, their automatic motions underscored by Eliot's use of rhyme. They are observed by the figure of Tiresias, a character taken from classical myth who lived as a woman for seven years and then was blinded and given the gift of prophecy. Unlike the previous allusions to times past, Tiresias indicates that love has always been this dispassionate and squalid. The poem moves back to the Thames, again using allusions to the past to highlight its current state of decay and sterility, but the section ends on a possibly hopeful note with the words of St Augustine and the Buddha, both of whom lived lives of extravagance before adopting asceticism. It is only at this point that the reason for the section title is clear, "The Fire Sermon" being a teaching delivered by the Buddha.

==== IV. Death by Water ====
This is the shortest section of the poem, describing the aftermath of the drowning of Phoenician sailor Phlebas, an event forewarned by Madame Sosostris. His corpse is still trapped in a whirlpool that serves as a metaphor for the cycle of life and death, and serves as a warning to pursue a meaningful life.

==== V. What the Thunder Said ====
The poem returns to the arid desert scene visited in Part I. Rain has not arrived, despite the promise from thunder and the approaching spring. A description of a journey across the desert is interspersed with references to the death and resurrection of Jesus, implying that the journey has a spiritual element. The journey ends at a chapel, but it is ruined. Rain finally arrives with the thunder, and its noise is linked with text from the Hindu Brihadaranyaka Upanishad, joining Eastern religion with Western. The thunder implores the narrator to "give", but the associated imagery suggests he may already be dead; to "sympathise", but he contends that every person is trapped in their own self-centred prison; and to "control", which is explored with the metaphor of a sailor co-operating with wind and water. The narrator ends up fishing at the sea shore, having travelled across the desert. He considers taking some form of action in his final question "Shall I at least set my lands in order?" but does not resolve to do anything. The poem ends with fragmentary quotations perhaps suggesting the possibility of new life, and finally the line "Shantih shantih shantih" ("Peace peace peace"), the formal ending to an Upanishad.

==== Notes ====
The text of the poem is followed by several pages of notes by Eliot, purporting to explain his own metaphors, references, and allusions. These were included in order to lengthen the work so that it could be published as a book, as well as to pre-empt accusations of plagiarism which his earlier work had been charged with. Pound later observed that the notes served to pique the interest of reviewers and academic critics. However they are considered to be of limited use for interpreting the poem, and Eliot's own interpretations changed over the succeeding decades. Eliot later expressed some regret at including the notes at all, saying in 1956 that they had prompted "the remarkable exposition of bogus scholarship".

=== Style ===
"What is that noise?"
The wind under the door.
"What is that noise now? What is the wind doing?"
Nothing again nothing.
"Do
"You know nothing? Do you see nothing? Do you remember
"Nothing?"
I remember
Those are pearls that were his eyes.
"Are you alive, or not? Is there nothing in your head?"
But
O O O O that Shakespeherian Rag—
It's so elegant
So intelligent

— "A Game of Chess", lines 117–130

The style of the poem is marked by the many intertextual allusions and quotations that Eliot included, and their juxtaposition. In addition to the many "highbrow" references and quotations from poets such as Baudelaire, Dante, Ovid, and Homer, he included several references to "lowbrow" genres, such as an allusion to the 1912 popular song "That Shakespearian Rag" by Gene Buck, Herman Ruby and Dave Stamper. The poem contrasts such elements throughout: "Ornate vocabulary gives way to colloquial dialogue, lyrical moments are interrupted by sordid intrusions, the comic and the macabre coexist with the solemn words of religious instruction, one language is supplanted by another, until in the final lines of the poem the fragments are collected together."

The Waste Land is notable for its seemingly disjointed structure, employing a wide variety of voices which are presented sometimes in monologue, dialogue, or with more than two characters speaking. The poem jumps from one voice or image to another without clearly delineating these shifts for the reader, creating the paradoxical effect of a poem which contains deeply personal subject matter being simultaneously an impersonal collage. As Eliot explained in his 1919 essay "Tradition and the Individual Talent", he saw the ideal poet as a conduit who creates a piece of art that reflects culture and society, as well as their own perspective and experiences, in an impersonal and craftsmanlike way.

The poem plays with traditional forms of metre and rhyme, often implying blank verse without strictly committing to it (especially through quotations of works that are themselves written in such a metre). Lines are often fragmented, and verses are generally of unequal length, although there are instances of regularity—for example, the first two verses of "The Fire Sermon" are formed like Petrarchan sonnets. During the editing process, Pound would highlight lines that were "too penty" (i.e. too close to iambic pentameter), prompting them to be changed to less regular rhythms. Eliot disliked the term "free verse", however, believing it impossible to write verse that is truly "free".

== Sources and influences ==
Sources which Eliot quotes or alludes to include the works of classical figures Sophocles, Petronius, Virgil, and Ovid; 14th-century writers Dante and Geoffrey Chaucer; Elizabethan and Jacobean writers Edmund Spenser, Thomas Kyd, William Shakespeare, Thomas Middleton, and John Webster; 19th-century figures Gérard de Nerval, Paul Verlaine, Charles Baudelaire, Alfred Tennyson, and Richard Wagner; and more contemporary writers Aldous Huxley, Hermann Hesse, Frank Chapman and F. H. Bradley. Additionally Eliot makes extensive use of religious writings, including the Christian Bible and Book of Common Prayer, the Hindu Brihadaranyaka Upanishad, and the Buddha's Fire Sermon; and of cultural and anthropological studies such as James Frazer's The Golden Bough and Jessie Weston's From Ritual to Romance.

As well as drawing from myth and fiction, Eliot included people he knew as figures in the poem. "The Burial of the Dead" contains the character Marie, who is based on Marie Larisch, and the "hyacinth girl" represents Emily Hale, with whom Eliot had fallen in love several years previously. "A Game of Chess" features a representation of Vivienne; and its conversations are taken from those overheard by the couple while in a local pub.

Scholars have identified more contemporary artistic influences on Eliot, contrary to the poet's own focus on older and foreign-language influences. Eliot had read early drafts of parts of Ulysses and corresponded with Joyce about them, and its influence is seen in the symbolist use of cross-references and stylistic variety in The Waste Land, as well as the mythic parallels between the characters of Ulysses and those of the Odyssey, writing that this "mythical method" had "the importance of a scientific discovery". Eliot would later express the opinion that, compared to The Waste Land, Ulysses was a superior example of such literary developments, and the novel has been described as "the most important model for the poem". Unlike its use in Ulysses, however, Eliot saw the mythical method as a way to write poetry without relying on conventional narration—he uses his mythical sources for their ritualistic structures, rather than as a counterpoint to the poem's "story".

Eliot was resistant to ascribing any influence to Walt Whitman, instead expressing a preference for Jules Laforgue (who was himself a Whitman translator and admirer). Nevertheless, scholars have noted strong similarities in the two poets' use of free verse. The first lines of The Waste Land, which are an inversion of Chaucer's opening to The Canterbury Tales, strongly resemble Whitman's imagery at the beginning of "When Lilacs Last in the Dooryard Bloom'd":

April is the cruellest month, breeding
Lilacs out of the dead land, mixing
Memory and desire, stirring
Dull roots with spring rain.

— T. S. Eliot, The Waste Land, lines 1–4

When lilacs last in the dooryard bloom'd,
And the great star early droop'd in the western sky in the night,
I mourn'd, and yet shall mourn with ever-returning spring.

— Walt Whitman, "When Lilacs Last in the Dooryard Bloom'd", lines 1–3

Whan that Aprille with his shoures sote
The droghte of Marche hath perced to the rote,
And bathed every veyne in swich licour,
Of which vertu engendred is the flour;

— Geoffrey Chaucer, The Canterbury Tales (Prologue), lines 1–4

As well as the motif of lilacs growing in the spring, Whitman treats the inevitable return of spring as "an occasion for mourning the death that allows for rebirth", a similar perspective being put forward by Eliot and completely contrary to Chaucer, who celebrates the "sweet showers" of April bringing forth spring flowers. Scholar Pericles Lewis further argues that Whitman's speech-like rhythms anticipate the even more free style of The Waste Land, adhering to Pound's dictum that verse should "[depart] in no way from speech save by a heightened intensity (i.e. simplicity)". Critic Harold Bloom goes on to identify further similarities between the two poems, with Eliot's "third who always walks beside you" as Whitman's "knowledge of death", and the poems themselves as "an elegy for the poet's own genius, rather than a lament for Western civilization".

Pablo Picasso, Bowl with Fruit, Violin, and Wineglass (1912)

The Waste Land was also informed by developments in the visual arts. Its style and content reflect the methods of Cubism and Futurism to take apart and reassemble their subjects in different forms, and the interest of Surrealism in the unconscious mind and its influence on culture—similar themes to what interested Eliot about The Golden Bough. Scholar Jacob Korg identifies similarities with the collage techniques of Braque and Picasso, wherein the artists' increasingly non-representational works would include a small piece of "realistic" detail. In the same sense, The Waste Land directly includes "reality", such as the pub conversation and the phrase "London Bridge is falling down", alongside its "imagined" content, to achieve a similar effect.

== Themes and interpretations ==
Interpretations of The Waste Land in the first few decades after its publication had been closely linked to Romance, due to Eliot's prominent acknowledgement of Jessie Weston's 1920 book From Ritual to Romance in his notes. Eliot's 1956 disavowal of this line of enquiry with his comment that they invited "bogus scholarship", however, prompted reinterpretations of the poem—less as a work which incorporates previous Romantic ideals and the "magic of the grail legend", and more as a poem describing "alienation, fragmentation, despair and disenchantment" in the post-war period, which are considered typical features of modernist literature.

=== Fertility and the Fisher King myth ===
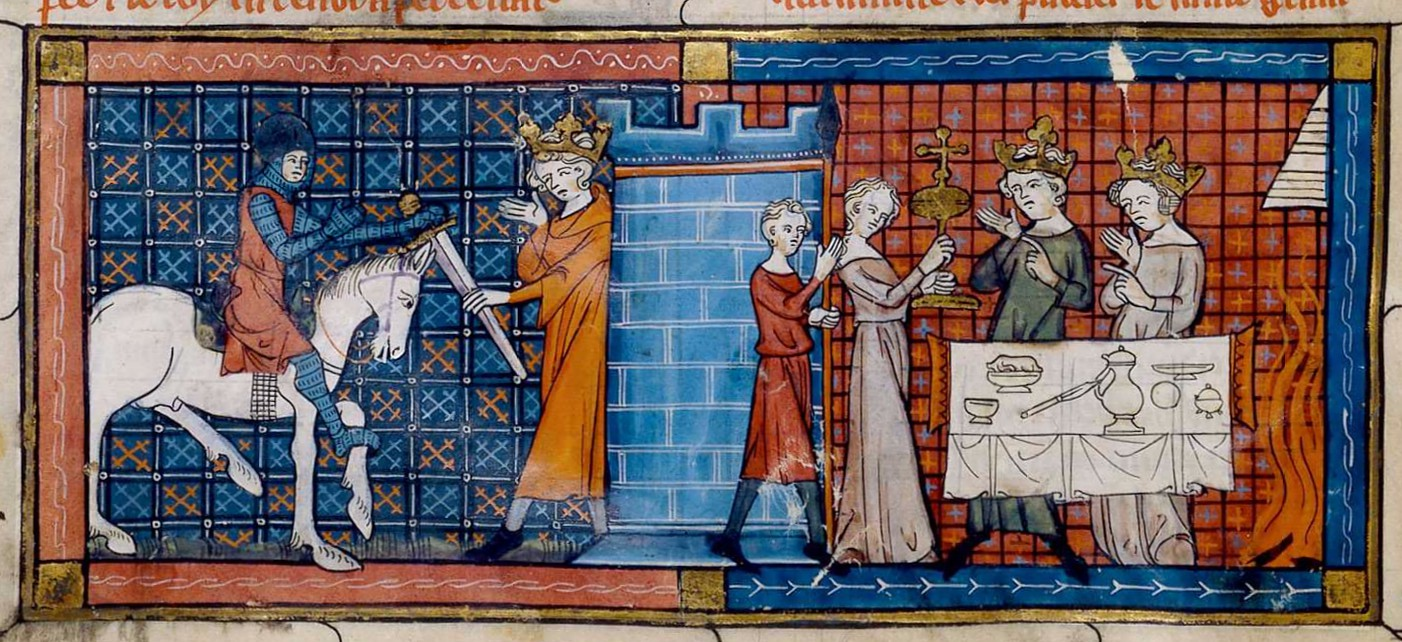
Perceval arrives at the Grail Castle to be greeted by the Fisher King in an illustration for a 1330 manuscript of Perceval, the Story of the Grail.

In his notes, Eliot credits Weston's work of comparative religion From Ritual to Romance with inspiring "the plan and a good deal of the incidental symbolism of the poem". Weston concentrates on the story of the Fisher King, part of the Holy Grail mythos which has its origins in Perceval, the Story of the Grail, written by Chrétien de Troyes in the 1180s. In the story, Perceval is a young man who meets a group of knights one day in the forest and leaves with them to be trained in knightly ways at King Arthur's court. The key lesson he is taught is not to speak too much. While out riding one day, Perceval meets two men fishing in a river; they offer him hospitality in a nearby castle. In the castle hall, he meets the Fisher King, who is gravely wounded. Supernatural events begin to occur: a boy brings a white lance into the hall, and a drop of blood falls from its tip. Two more boys holding candlesticks appear, and then a girl holding a gold grail set with precious stones and radiating light. The grail, in this telling a kind of platter, provides food for the guests in the hall. Remembering his training, Perceval asks no questions about these strange happenings, and when he awakens the next day he finds the hall empty: his apparent lack of curiosity has been taken as indifference. Perceval returns to Camelot, and while at the Round Table a "loathsome damsel" appears to denounce him, saying that various calamities will occur because the Fisher King cannot defend his lands, still being in his injured state. As a result, Perceval loses his religious faith. Five years later, Perceval seeks help from his uncle, a hermit. His uncle instructs him in knightly ways, and Perceval receives communion.

At this point Chrétien's story ends. It was continued in several different versions by various authors. Robert de Boron introduces an explicit link between the grail and Jesus' crucifixion, and in this version Perceval returns to the castle, asks the correct (secret) question of the Fisher King, and becomes keeper of the grail himself. Another continuation was by Wolfram von Eschenbach, who made the Fisher King's injury a sterilising groin injury, and the question Perceval asks "What aileth thee, mine uncle?" (in Weston's translation). The asking of the question, an act of compassion, is ultimately what heals the king and restores the land.

Weston interprets the story of the Fisher King as a continuation of pagan fertility rites. She focuses on the idea of a "waste land" surrounding the Fisher King's castle, which will be restored along with the king's health, only after the correct question is asked. In this sense it is a story of death and rebirth, as well as an allegory for reproduction, with the lance representing male genitalia and the grail female. Weston considers the fish symbol as an analogy for fertility, a connection later lost in readings of the Grail legend.

The Waste Land can be interpreted as being, at least in part, narrated by a Fisher King character, living in a modern industrial "wasted land". Eliot's notes indicate that he associated the Fisher King with one of the tarot cards drawn in "The Burial of the Dead" (the man with three staves); "The Fire Sermon" contains a figure fruitlessly fishing in a polluted canal in winter as a direct parallel of the men Perceval encountered fishing in a stream; and the final verse of "What the Thunder Said" describes a Fisher King character fishing in the sea, considering the question "Shall I at least set my lands in order?"

The mythic themes of fertility take on a more concrete role in the middle parts of the poem, which deal with scenes of sexuality. "A Game of Chess" includes a scene of a married couple playing chess in an opulent setting which contrasts with two sexless dialogues "illustrating two aspects of the terrible emotional barrenness of the modern world". The section continues to a matter-of-fact conversation between two women about infidelity and abortion, blending into the last words of Ophelia in Hamlet before she committed suicide by drowning – an end to life, rather than a baptismal rebirth. "The Fire Sermon" describes a dispassionate affair, perhaps a parody of Frazer's "sanctified harlotry" ritual in which "in order to promote fertility, a girl consorted with a stranger before marriage, the act being accompanied by a ritual feast and music."

=== Death and regeneration ===
Themes of death and regeneration more generally occur throughout The Waste Land, especially in "The Burial of the Dead". Unlike in fertility myths such as that of the Fisher King, however, "death is never redeemed by any clear salvation, and barrenness is relieved only by a chaotic multiplicity, which is not only an ironic kind of fertility, but is also the distinctly urban chaos that the young Eliot appreciated as conducive to his work." The poem opens with a resistance to growth after a winter that represents a "living death", and a yearning for stasis which contrasts with the Sibyl of the epigraph, who longs for a death that means escape from a static existence. "The Burial of the Dead" also describes a dry and lifeless desert scene which, despite the prospect of shade and therefore respite, promises only a vision of death – to "show you fear in a handful of dust". Madame Sosostris draws the drowned Phoenician sailor, but he is later a symbol of Adonis, representing the promise of spring and thus renewal, and his drowning can be read as an allegory for baptism, a spiritual rebirth. The living death of The Waste Land sees people bury corpses and expect them to sprout, in a deliberate reference to the rituals of Osiris as described by Frazer, when priests would bury effigies of the god to ensure a good harvest.

=== Post-war disillusionment ===
I dislike the word "generation", which has been a talisman for the last ten years; when I wrote a poem called The Waste Land some of the more approving critics said that I had expressed the "disillusionment of a generation", which is nonsense. I may have expressed for them their own illusion of being disillusioned, but that did not form part of my intention.

— T. S. Eliot, Thoughts After Lambeth (1931)

The Waste Land can be read as an expression of post-war disillusionment and anxieties about Western culture. Critic Burton Rascoe wrote that the poem "gives voice to the universal despair or resignation arising from the spiritual and economic consequences of the war, the cross purposes of modern civilization, the cul-de-sac into which both science and philosophy seem to have got themselves and the breakdown of all great directive purposes which give joy and zest to the business of living. It is an erudite despair." Eliot disliked being described as a poet who had "expressed 'the disillusionment of a generation'", but this was a reading common even in the early days after the poem's publication. The poem describes a barren modern waste land after the largest war ever fought, without the traditional common cultural touchstones of religion, aristocracy, and nationhood. Being unable to grow anything new, the poet has only "a heap of broken images" from ages past to assemble, and The Waste Land represents an attempt to create something new out of these.

One way in which the poem expresses this disillusionment is in the contrast between its quotations and allusions to older texts and representations of the modern day. "A Game of Chess" contrasts a modern woman with an elaborate description of Queen Cleopatra and Belinda from The Rape of the Lock in an ornate setting; it also juxtaposes the working class women's conversation with Ophelia's last words in Hamlet. In this way, an idealised past is presented as an unrealistically prelapsarian place, and "modern civilisation does nothing but spoil what was once gracious, lovely, ceremonious and natural."

Scholars observe Eliot's depiction of modern London as being an example of these themes as well. The distasteful description of the River Thames in "The Fire Sermon" invites comparison with its beauty in Spenser's day, and the beautiful Rhinemaidens of Wagner's Ring cycle, who guard gold at the bottom of the Rhine, are ironically placed in the polluted Thames. The poem's final verse contains the titular line of the nursery rhyme "London Bridge Is Falling Down", showing that even with the optimism of potential rebirth the city is destined for ruin. The sounds of the city accompany the passionless affair of the typist in "The Fire Sermon", linking it to sterility, and its inhabitants cannot rely on a shared sense of community—they live in a version of Dante's Limbo, a static lifeless realm neither life nor death. Eliot makes a direct reference to Inferno in the line "I had not thought death had undone so many", and indicates that the people living in this city have chosen, through cowardice, not to die (and possibly be reborn) but to remain in this state of living death.

=== Religion ===
==== Christianity ====
Christianity infuses the Fisher King legend, and questions of death and rebirth are central concerns of all religions. The Bible has been described as "probably the single most pervasive influence on the poem". Eliot adopts a deliberately prophetic Old Testament tone of voice in "The Burial of the Dead", referencing Ezekiel and Ecclesiastes. The Ezekiel source describes the prophet's mission in a secular world, and the book is relevant again in the depiction of a dry desert-like waste land. Ezekiel prophesied the Babylonian captivity, which is alluded to in the description of the Thames as the "waters of Leman" in "The Fire Sermon". The Ecclesiastes section referenced contains a description of a waste land, and "What the Thunder Said" refers to it again in its "doors of mudcracked houses" and "empty cisterns". New Testament symbols include the card of the Hanged Man, which represents Jesus, and "What the Thunder Said" references the Road to Emmaus appearance, in which the resurrected Christ is not recognised by his disciples.

==== Buddhism ====
The Waste Land also contains allusions to Buddhism and Hinduism, both of which Eliot came into contact with while studying as a postgraduate in the Department of Philosophy at Harvard in 1911–1914. The title of "The Fire Sermon" takes its name from the Buddhist discourse of the same name, which uses the metaphor of fire to mean both the inherent pain of physical existence and the process of purification to transcend that pain. Eliot juxtaposes the Buddha with St Augustine, both representing historical figures who turned away from worldly pleasures to follow a life of asceticism. Their combined voices blend into the poem's narrator at the end of the section ("Thou pluckest me out"), becoming the voice of prophecy, and the section tails off in a meditative fashion, losing the narrator "me", then "Lord", leaving only "burning".

==== Hinduism ====
Sanskrit quotations from the Hindu Brihadaranyaka Upanishad, part of the collection of texts known as the Vedas, occur throughout the final section, "What the Thunder Said". The three words "datta", "dayadhvam" and "damyata" are an instruction to observe charity, compassion and self-control, and the poem's final line is the same as that of every Upanishad: "Shantih shantih shantih" ("peace peace peace"). This gives the impression of a desire for the readers to end their post-war suffering on the physical, natural and spiritual planes by following these virtues. The poem contains other allusions to Hindu scripture, such as the appearance of the sacred river Ganges called by its traditional name in the line "Ganga was sunken", and it can be read as an allegory similar to themes found in the Vedas where drought or sterility is caused by an evil force. In this reading the poet takes the role of a priest, whose role is to purify the land and release its potential fertility.

== Influence ==
The Waste Land is considered to be one of the most important and influential poems of the 20th century. The poem has been praised for its aesthetic value, and its originality influenced modernist poets: "While we have become accustomed to such poetic techniques as allusion, ironic juxtaposition, and sudden shifts in imagery and style, Eliot's use of them seemed strikingly new in 1922". Lewis (2007) comments that "Later poetic practice was largely shaped by Pound's advocacy of free verse and Eliot's example", and Pound later took Eliot's example of using different languages even further, including Chinese characters in his Cantos which would have been completely unintelligible to a large majority of his readers.

The poem has influenced several prose works. George Orwell used allusive techniques in a manner influenced by Eliot, most clearly in the popular song references of Keep the Aspidistra Flying and the epigraphs of Down and Out in London and Paris and Coming Up For Air. Similarly, The Sound and the Fury by William Faulkner displays structural parallels to The Waste Land in its juxtapositions of different times, and its use of intratextual association and repetition. Raymond Chandler makes more clear-cut references to the poem in The Long Goodbye, both within the text with characters who read Eliot, and thematically, such as in the novel's chess game. Anthony Burgess employs similar stylistic elements in The Malayan Trilogy, with his characters reading the poem, and thematic elements such as Victor Crabbe fearing death by water. The Great Gatsby by F. Scott Fitzgerald contains similarities to The Waste Land in its setting ("Central to the novel's total effect, as in Eliot's poem, are symbols and images of waste, desolation, and futility") and characterisation ("'What do people plan?' [Daisy] asks, and the sentence is symbolic of her emptiness; she is like Eliot's lady in The Waste Land who cries out, 'What shall we do tomorrow? What shall we ever do?'"). The poem also gives Evelyn Waugh's novel A Handful of Dust not just its title, but a number of key themes.

Lesley Wheeler argues that despite Eliot's large influence on 20th-century poetry, largely due to the success of The Waste Land, his impact on poets this century is much diminished:

As editor, critic, and builder of poetic landmarks from recycled materials, the man overshadowed Anglo-American poetry for generations. For William Carlos Williams, the atomic blast of The Waste Land knocked American poetry out of its groove. For poets born in the thirties and forties – Craig Raine, Wendy Cope, Derek Walcott, Seamus Heaney – Eliot is monumental, although those writers have different responses to his looming edifice. Poets born since, though, metabolized Eliot differently. It's not that modernism is less relevant. Younger writers claim certain modernist poets over and over: Williams, W. B. Yeats, Robert Frost, Gertrude Stein, Wallace Stevens, Langston Hughes, H.D., Robert Hayden, Gwendolyn Brooks. Eliot just isn't on their public lists quite so often.

Wheeler attributes this change to a number of causes, such as Eliot's lower prominence on school curricula, biographies highlighting his antisemitism, and his "misogynistic and homoerotic correspondence with Ezra Pound". She posits that perhaps the poem is a victim of its own obscurity, demanding interpretation over providing an engaging reading experience.

=== Parodies ===
Parodies of this poem have also been written. One is by Eliot's contemporary H. P. Lovecraft, entitled "Waste Paper: A Poem of Profound Insignificance". Written in 1922 or 1923, it is regarded by scholar S. T. Joshi to be one of Lovecraft's best satires. Wendy Cope published a parody of The Waste Land, condensing the poem into five limericks, Waste Land Limericks, in her 1986 collection Making Cocoa for Kingsley Amis. John Beer published a modern take on The Waste Land in 2010 which is part satire and part homage.

== See also ==
- 1922 in poetry
- Eliot's essay "Tradition and the Individual Talent"
