= Modern Library 100 Best Nonfiction =

List of nonfiction books considered the best

- Description: 100 best non-fiction books published since 1900
- Country: United States
- Presented by: Modern Library
- Website: www.modernlibrary.com/top-100/100-best-nonfiction/

The Modern Library 100 Best Nonfiction was created in 1998 by the Modern Library. The list is what it considers to be the 100 best non-fiction books published since 1900.

The list includes memoirs, textbooks, polemics, and collections of essays. A separate list of the 100 best novels of the 20th century was created the same year.

The following table shows the top ten books from the editors' list:

#	Year	Title	Author
1	1918	The Education of Henry Adams	Henry Brooks Adams
2	1902	The Varieties of Religious Experience	William James
3	1901	Up from Slavery	Booker T. Washington
4	1929	A Room of One's Own	Virginia Woolf
5	1962	Silent Spring	Rachel Carson
6	1932	Selected Essays, 1917–1932	T. S. Eliot
7	1968	The Double Helix	James D. Watson
8	1951	Speak, Memory	Vladimir Nabokov
9	1919	The American Language	H. L. Mencken
10	1936	The General Theory of Employment, Interest and Money	John Maynard Keynes
