= The Sacred Wood =

Book by T. S. Eliot

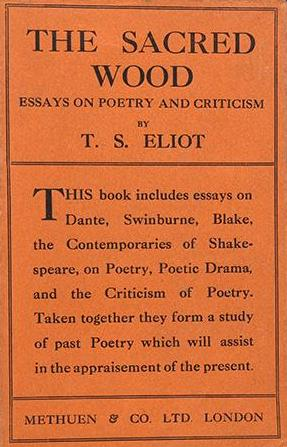
- Author: T. S. Eliot
- Genre: Literary criticism
- Publisher: Methuen & Co.; Alfred A. Knopf
- Publication date: 1920
- Publication place: London, United Kingdom; New York, N.Y., United States
- Pages: 155 (U.K.)
- OCLC: 1005416

The Sacred Wood: Essays on Poetry and Criticism is a collection of 20 essays by T. S. Eliot, first published in 1920. Topics include Eliot's opinions of many literary works and authors, including William Shakespeare's play Hamlet, and the poets Dante Alighieri and William Blake.

One of his most important prose works, "Tradition and the Individual Talent", which was originally published in two parts in The Egoist, is a part of The Sacred Wood. The book also contains the essay "Hamlet and His Problems", in which Eliot first put forward his idea of the objective correlative.

The essay "Philip Massinger" contains the famous line (often misquoted) "Immature poets imitate, mature poets steal".
