= Selected Essays, 1917–1932 =

Collection of works by T. S. Eliot

Selected Essays, 1917–1932 is a collection of prose and literary criticism by T. S. Eliot. Eliot's work fundamentally changed literary thinking and Selected Essays provides both an overview and an in-depth examination of his theory. It was published in 1932 by his employers, Faber & Faber, costing 12/6 (2009: £24).

In addition to his poetry, by 1932, Eliot was already accepted as one of English Literature's most important critics. In this position he was instrumental in the reviving interest in the long‐neglected Jacobean playwrights. A Dialogue on Dramatic Poetry was originally an addendum to Eliot's preface to Dryden's Essay of Dramatick Poesie (1928 reprint). Further essays include The Metaphysical Poets (1921) in which Eliot argued that a "dissociation of sensibility" set in... due to the influence of ... Milton and Dryden. Furthermore the modern poet ‘must be difficult’... ‘to force, to dislocate if necessary, language into his meaning’. Philip Massinger (1920) contains his aphorism "Immature poets imitate; mature poets steal".

Eliot converted to the Church of England and some of the essays expressed the form and discipline he felt necessary for fulfilment in his own life. For Lancelot Andrewes (1926), examines Andrewes, a 17th-century Anglican bishop who Eliot considers an important figure in the history of the church, distinguished for the quality of his thoughts and prose. In The Humanism of Irving Babbitt (1927), Eliot posits that Babbitt's faith in civilization must have a discipline derived from dogmatic religious authority.

In 1951 Eliot republished the book as Selected Essays, with a new preface and 5 additional essays (listed below). These were all written within 3 years of the original 1932 publication. Eliot notes several essays not collected in this edition but declares Selected Essays to already be 'bulky enough'.

== Reception ==
Selected Essays was placed fourth in the Intercollegiate Studies Institute's Fifty Best Books of the Century and sixth in Modern Library's Best 20th-Century Nonfiction.

== Contents ==
Eliot dedicated the collection to Harriet Shaw Weaver.

I

- Tradition and the Individual Talent (1917)
- The Function of Criticism (1923)

II

- "Rhetoric" and Poetic Drama (1919)
- A Dialogue on Dramatic Poetry (1928)
- Euripides and Professor Murray (1918)
- Seneca in Elizabethan Translation (1927)

III

- Four Elizabethan Dramatists (1924)
- Christopher Marlowe (1918)
- Shakespeare and the Stoicism of Seneca (1927)
- Hamlet and His Problems (1919)
- Ben Johnson (1919)
- Thomas Middleton (1927)
- Thomas Heywood (1931)
- Cyril Tourneur (1931)
- John Ford (1932)
- Philip Massinger (1920)
- John Marston (1934, added to the 1951 edition)

IV

- Dante (1929)

V

- The Metaphysical Poets (1921)
- Andrew Marvell (1921)
- John Dryden (1922)
- William Blake (1920)
- Swinburne as Poet (1920)
- In Memoriam, Alfred, Lord Tennyson (1936, added to the 1951 edition)

VI

- Lancelot Andrewes (1926)
- John Bramhall (1927)
- Thoughts after Lambeth (1931)
- Religion and Literature (1935, added to the 1951 edition)
- The Pensées of Pascal (1931, added to the 1951 edition)

VII

- Baudelaire (1930)
- Arnold and Pater (1930)
- Francis Herbert Bradley (1926)
- Marie Lloyd (1923)
- Wilkie Collins and Dickens (1927)
- The Humanism of Irving Babbitt (1927)
- Second Thoughts about Humanism (1929)
- Charles Whibley (1931)
- Modern Education and the Classics (1935, added to the 1951 edition)
