= The Criterion =

Former British literary magazine

- Editor: T. S. Eliot
- Frequency: Quarterly (for most of its run), Monthly (1927–28)
- Publisher: Faber and Gwyer Publishing (later Faber and Faber)
- Founder: T. S. Eliot
- Country: United Kingdom
- Language: English

The Criterion was a British literary magazine published from October 1922 to January 1939. The Criterion (or the Criterion) was, for most of its run, a quarterly journal, although for a period in 1927–28 it was published monthly. It was created by the poet, dramatist, and literary critic T. S. Eliot who served as its editor for its entire run.

== Mission and content ==
Eliot's goal was to make it a literary review dedicated to the maintenance of standards and the reunification of a European intellectual community. Although in a letter to a friend in 1935 George Orwell had said "for pure snootiness it beats anything I have ever seen", writing in 1944 he referred to it as "possibly the best literary paper we have ever had".

The first issue of the magazine, of which 600 copies were printed, included Eliot's The Waste Land. In its first year, it received contributions from Luigi Pirandello, Virginia Woolf, Ezra Pound, E. M. Forster, and W. B. Yeats. Other contributors over the years included Wyndham Lewis, Herbert Read, John Middleton Murry, John Gould Fletcher, W. H. Auden, Stephen Spender, and Hart Crane. Nine contributions in 1924 and 1925 were made, pseudonymously, by Eliot's first wife, Vivienne Haigh-Wood, who suggested the journal's name. The Criterion became the first English periodical to publish Marcel Proust, Paul Valéry and Jean Cocteau.

Lady Rothermere (Mary Lilian Share, the wife of the London newspaper magnate Harold Harmsworth, Viscount Rothermere) originally financed the journal, but on reading the first issue, she wrote three letters to Eliot criticising it, and suggested ideas for later issues, including a story by Katherine Mansfield. After four years she withdrew her support and the magazine was acquired by Eliot's employer, Faber and Gwyer Publishing (later Faber and Faber). From January 1926, when Faber became the publisher, though January 1927 the journal was titled The New Criterion. The issues from May 1927 though March 1928 were titled The Monthly Criterion.

Some of Eliot's other contributions include his short story "On the Eve", commentaries, and poems, including early versions of "The Hollow Men" and "Ash Wednesday".

Together with its rival, The Adelphi, edited by John Middleton Murry, it was the leading literary journal of the period. While the former's definitions of literature were based on romanticism allied to liberalism and a subjective approach, Eliot used his publication for expounding his defence of classicism, tradition, and Catholicism. In this contest Eliot emerged a clear victor, in the sense that in the London of the 1930s he had taken the centre of the critical stage.
