= Tradition and the Individual Talent =

1919 essay by T. S. Eliot

- Language: English
- Publication date: 1919
- Text: Tradition and the Individual Talent at Internet Archive

"Tradition and the Individual Talent" (1919) is an essay written by poet and literary critic T. S. Eliot. The essay was first published in The Egoist (1919) and later in Eliot's first book of criticism, The Sacred Wood (1920). The essay is also available in Eliot's Selected Prose and Selected Essays.

While Eliot is most often known for his poetry, he also contributed to the field of literary criticism. In this dual role, he acted as a cultural critic, comparable to Sir Philip Sidney and Samuel Taylor Coleridge. "Tradition and the Individual Talent" is one of the better-known works that Eliot produced in his critic capacity. It formulates Eliot's influential conception of the relationship between the poet and preceding literary traditions.

== Content of the essay ==
This essay is divided into three parts: first the concept of "Tradition," then the Theory of Impersonal Poetry, and finally the conclusion.

Eliot presents his conception of tradition and the definition of the poet and poetry in relation to it. He wishes to correct the fact that, as he perceives it, "in English writing we seldom speak of tradition, though we occasionally apply its name in deploring its absence." Eliot posits that, though the English tradition generally upholds the belief that art progresses through change – a separation from tradition, literary advancements are instead recognised only when they conform to the tradition. Eliot, a classicist, felt that the true incorporation of tradition into literature was unrecognised, that tradition, a word that "seldom... appear[s] except in a phrase of censure," was actually a thus-far unrealised element of literary criticism.

For Eliot, the term "tradition" is imbued with a special and complex character. It represents a "simultaneous order," by which Eliot means a historical timelessness – a fusion of past and present – and, at the same time, a sense of present temporality. A poet must embody "the whole of the literature of Europe from Homer," while, simultaneously, expressing their contemporary environment. Eliot challenges the common perception that a poet's greatness and individuality lie in their departure from their predecessors; he argues that "the most individual parts of his [the poet's] work may be those in which the dead poets, his ancestors, assert their immortality most vigorously." Eliot claims that this "historical sense" is not only a resemblance to traditional works but an awareness and understanding of their relation to his poetry.

This fidelity to tradition, however, does not require the great poet to forfeit novelty in an act of surrender to repetition. Rather, Eliot has a much more dynamic and progressive conception of the poetic process: novelty is possible only through tapping into tradition. When a poet engages in the creation of new work, they realise an aesthetic "ideal order," as it has been established by the literary tradition that has come before them. As such, the act of artistic creation does not take place in a vacuum. The introduction of a new work alters the cohesion of this existing order, and causes a readjustment of the old to accommodate the new. The inclusion of the new work alters the way in which the past is seen; elements of the past that are noted and realised. In Eliot's own words, "What happens when a new work of art is created is something that happens simultaneously to all the works of art that preceded it." Eliot refers to this organic tradition, this developing canon, as the "mind of Europe." The private mind is subsumed by this more massive one.

This leads to Eliot's so-called "Impersonal Theory" of poetry. Since the poet engages in a "continual surrender of himself" to the vast order of tradition, artistic creation is a process of depersonalisation. The mature poet is viewed as a medium, through which tradition is channelled and elaborated. He compares the poet to a catalyst in a chemical reaction, in which the reactants are feelings and emotions that are synthesised to create an artistic image that captures and relays these same feelings and emotions. While the mind of the poet is necessary for the production, it emerges unaffected by the process. The artist stores feelings and emotions and properly unites them into a specific combination, which is the artistic product. What lends greatness to a work of art are not the feelings and emotions themselves, but the nature of the artistic process by which they are synthesised. The artist is responsible for creating "the pressure, so to speak, under which the fusion takes place." And, it is the intensity of fusion that renders art great. In this view, Eliot rejects the theory that art expresses metaphysical unity in the soul of the poet. The poet is a depersonalised vessel, a mere medium.

Great works do not express the personal emotion of the poet. The poet does not reveal their own unique and novel emotions, but rather, by drawing on ordinary ones and channelling them through the intensity of poetry, they express feelings that surpass, altogether, experienced emotion. This is what Eliot intends when he discusses poetry as an "escape from emotion." Since successful poetry is impersonal and, therefore, exists independent of its poet, it outlives the poet and can incorporate into the timeless "ideal order" of the "living" literary tradition.

Another essay found in Selected Essays relates to this notion of the impersonal poet. In "Hamlet and His Problems" Eliot presents the phrase "objective correlative." The theory is that the expression of emotion in art can be achieved by a specific, and almost formulaic, prescription of a set of objects, including events and situations. A particular emotion is created by presenting its correlated objective sign. The author is depersonalised in this conception, since he is the mere effecter of the sign. And, it is the sign, and not the poet, which creates emotion.

The implications here separate Eliot's idea of talent from the conventional definition (just as his idea of Tradition is separate from the conventional definition), one so far from it, perhaps, that he chooses never to directly label it as talent. The conventional definition of talent, especially in the arts, is a genius that one is born with. Not so for Eliot. Instead, talent is acquired through a careful study of poetry, claiming that Tradition, "cannot be inherited, and if you want it, you must obtain it by great labour." Eliot asserts that it is absolutely necessary for the poet to study, to have an understanding of the poets before them, and to be well versed enough that they can understand and incorporate the "mind of Europe" into their poetry. But the poet's study is unique – it is knowledge that "does not encroach," and that does not "deaden or pervert poetic sensibility." It is, to put it most simply, a poetic knowledge – knowledge observed through a poetic lens. This ideal implies that knowledge gleaned by a poet is not knowledge of facts, but knowledge which leads to a greater understanding of the mind of Europe. As Eliot explains, "Shakespeare acquired more essential history from Plutarch than most men could from the whole British Museum."

== Eliot and New Criticism ==
Unwittingly, Eliot inspired and informed the movement of New Criticism. This is somewhat ironic, since he later criticised their intensely detailed analysis of texts as unnecessarily tedious [citation?]. Yet, he does share with them the same focus on the aesthetic and stylistic qualities of poetry, rather than on its ideological content. The New Critics resemble Eliot in their close analysis of particular passages and poems.

== Criticism of Eliot ==
Eliot's theory of literary tradition has been criticised for its limited definition of what constitutes the canon of that tradition. He assumes the authority to choose what represents great poetry, and his choices have been criticised on several fronts. For example, Harold Bloom disagrees with Eliot's condescension towards Romantic poetry, which, in The Metaphysical Poets (1921) he criticises for its "dissociation of sensibility." Moreover, some criticise Eliot's discussion of the literary tradition as the "mind of Europe" as Euro-centric. However, it should be recognized that Eliot supported many Eastern and thus non-European works of literature such as the Mahabharata. Eliot was arguing the importance of a complete sensibility: he didn't particularly care what it was at the time of tradition and the individual talent. His own work is heavily influenced by non-Western traditions. In his broadcast talk "The Unity of European Culture," he said, "Long ago I studied the ancient Indian languages and while I was chiefly interested at that time in Philosophy, I read a little poetry too; and I know that my own poetry shows the influence of Indian thought and sensibility." His self-evaluation was confirmed by B. P. N. Sinha, who writes that Eliot went beyond Indian ideas to Indian form: "The West has preoccupied itself almost exclusively with the philosophy and thoughts of India. One consequence of this has been a total neglect of Indian forms of expression, i.e. of its literature. T. S. Eliot is the one major poet whose work bears evidence of intercourse with this aspect of Indian culture" (qtd. in The Composition of The Four Quartets). He does not account for a non-white and non-masculine tradition. As such, his notion of tradition stands at odds with feminist, post-colonial and minority theories.

Harold Bloom presents a conception of tradition that differs from that of Eliot. Whereas Eliot believes that the great poet is faithful to his predecessors and evolves in a concordant manner, Bloom (according to his theory of "anxiety of influence") envisions the "strong poet" to engage in a much more aggressive and tumultuous rebellion against tradition.

In 1964, his last year, Eliot published in a reprint of The Use of Poetry and the Use of Criticism, a series of lectures he gave at Harvard University in 1932 and 1933, a new preface in which he called "Tradition and the Individual Talent" the most juvenile of his essays (although he also indicated that he did not repudiate it.)

== Primary works of literary criticism by T. S. Eliot ==
- Homage to John Dryden: Three Essays on Poetry of the Seventeenth Century. London: L. and Virginia Woolf, 1927.
- On Poetry and Poets. London: Faber and Faber, 1957.
- The Sacred Wood: Essays on Poetry and Criticism. London Menthuen, 1950.
- Selected Essays. New York: Harcourt, Brace, 1950.
- The Varieties of Metaphysical Poetry. Ed. Ronald Schuchard. London: Faber and Faber, 1993.

== See also ==
- Great Conversation
