= Ash Wednesday (poem) =

1930 poem by T. S. Eliot

First edition (publ. Faber & Faber)

Ash Wednesday (sometimes Ash-Wednesday) is a long poem written by T. S. Eliot during his 1927 conversion to Anglicanism. Published in 1930, the poem deals with the struggle that ensues when one who has lacked faith in the past strives to move towards God.

Sometimes referred to as Eliot's "conversion poem", Ash-Wednesday, with a base of Dante's Purgatorio, is richly but ambiguously allusive and deals with the move from spiritual barrenness to hope for human salvation. The style is different from his poetry which predates his conversion. "Ash-Wednesday" and the poems that followed had a more casual, melodic, and contemplative method.

Many critics were "particularly enthusiastic concerning 'Ash-Wednesday'", while in other quarters it was not well received. Among many of the more secular literati its groundwork of orthodox Christianity was discomfiting. Edwin Muir maintained that "'Ash-Wednesday' is one of the most moving poems he [Eliot] has written, and perhaps the most perfect."

== Analysis ==
The poem’s title comes from the Western Christian fast day that marks the beginning of Lent, forty days before Easter. It is a poem about the difficulty of religious belief, and concerned with personal salvation in an age of uncertainty. In Ash Wednesday Eliot’s poetic persona, one who has lacked faith in the past, has somehow found the courage, through spiritual exhaustion, to seek faith.

In the first section, Eliot introduces the idea of renunciation with a quote from Cavalcanti, in which the poet expresses his devotion to his lady as death approaches. Dante Gabriel Rossetti translated it under the title Ballata, Written in Exile at Sarzana, and rendered the first line as "Because I do not hope to return". The idea of exile is thus also introduced.

=== Eliot's Opinion ===
In a 1930 letter, Eliot wrote "I fancy that parts IV and V of it are much better than II (Salutation)." In two separate letters, Eliot wrote that the leopards represent "the World, the Flesh and the Devil".

== Publication information ==
The poem was first published as now known in April, 1930 as a small book limited to 600 numbered and signed copies. Later that month an ordinary run of 2000 copies was published in the UK, and in September another 2000 copies were published in the US.

Eliot is known to have collected poems and fragments of poems to produce new works. This is most clearly seen in his poems "The Hollow Men" and "Ash-Wednesday" where he incorporated previously published poems to become sections of a larger work. Three of the five sections comprising "Ash-Wednesday" had already been published earlier as separate poems (years link to corresponding "[year] in poetry" articles):

- "Perch' Io non Spero" (part I of "Ash-Wednesday") was published in the Spring, 1928 issue of Commerce along with a French translation.
- "Salutation" (now part II of "Ash-Wednesday") was published in December, 1927 in Saturday Review of Literature. It was also published in January, 1928 in Eliot's own Criterion magazine.
- "Som de l'escalina" (part III of "Ash-Wednesday") was published in the Autumn, 1929 issue of Commerce along with a French translation.

(Publication information from Gallup)

=== Dedication ===
When first published, the poem bore the dedication "To my wife", referring to Eliot's first wife, Vivienne Haigh-Wood Eliot, with whom he had a strained relationship, and from whom he initiated a legal separation in 1933. The dedication does not appear in subsequent editions.

== Reception ==
=== Initial ===
The initial reception of Ash Wednesday was largely positive, though some critics claimed his previous poems were better.

== References in other works ==
Vladimir Nabokov parodied Ash Wednesday in his novel Lolita. In chapter 35 of Part Two of Nabokov's book, Humbert's "death sentence" on Quilty parodies the rhythm and use of anaphora in T. S. Eliot's poem. According to David Rampton, "...Quilty's versified death sentence is, in part, a comic version of Ash Wednesday." There was a reference to 'Ash Wednesday' by Narendra Luther while interpreting the stanza ...Consequently I rejoice, Having to construct something Upon which to rejoice... wherein he adds that he enjoyed every line, sentence, every page while writing books as they are building blocks for the final edifice. This is thus equated to the lines of T S Eliot, in the book A Bonsai Tree authored by Luther.

Two lines from Ash Wednesday are slightly misremembered by the character Clarice Starling in Thomas Harris's book The Silence of the Lambs and the 1991 film adaptation thereof. In the poem, the lines read "Teach us to care and not to care / Teach us to sit still." In the book, Clarice recalls the latter line as "Teach us to be still." In the afterword of later editions Harris writes, "Clarice Starling's memory alters lines from T. S. Eliots's 'Ash-Wednesday' to suit her."

Chris Marker uses the two lines "Because I know that time is always time And place is always and only place" from Ash Wednesday as the epitaph to the English version of his film Sans Soleil. The French version of the film uses a quote from Racine.
