= Objective correlative =

Group of things that represent emotions

In literary criticism, an objective correlative is a group of things or events which systematically represent emotions.

== Theory ==
The theory of the objective correlative as it relates to literature was largely developed through the writings of the poet and literary critic T.S. Eliot, who is associated with the literary group called the New Critics. Helping define the objective correlative, Eliot's essay "Hamlet and His Problems", republished in his book The Sacred Wood: Essays on Poetry and Criticism, discusses his view of Shakespeare's incomplete development of Hamlet's emotions in the play Hamlet. Eliot uses Lady Macbeth's state of mind as an example of the successful objective correlative: "The artistic 'inevitability' lies in this complete adequacy of the external to the emotion….", as a contrast to Hamlet. According to Eliot, the feelings of Hamlet are not sufficiently supported by the story and the other characters surrounding him. The objective correlative's purpose is to express the character's emotions by showing rather than describing feelings as discussed earlier by Plato and referred to by Peter Barry in his book Beginning Theory: An Introduction to Literary and Cultural Theory as "...perhaps little more than the ancient distinction (first made by Plato) between mimesis and diegesis…." (28). According to Formalist critics, this action of creating an emotion through external factors and evidence linked together and thus forming an objective correlative should produce an author's detachment from the depicted character and unite the emotion of the literary work.

The "occasion" of Eugenio Montale is a further form of correlative. The works of Eliot were translated into Italian by Montale, who earned the 1975 Nobel Prize in Literature.

== Origin of terminology ==
The term was coined by the American painter and poet Washington Allston (1779–1843), and was introduced by T. S. Eliot, rather casually, into his essay "Hamlet and His Problems" (1919); its subsequent vogue in literary criticism, Eliot said, astonished him. In "Hamlet and His Problems", Eliot used the term exclusively to refer to his claimed artistic mechanism whereby emotion is evoked in the audience:

The only way of expressing emotion in the form of art is by finding an "objective correlative"; in other words, a set of objects, a situation, a chain of events which shall be the formula of that particular emotion; such that when the external facts, which must terminate in sensory experience, are given, the emotion is immediately evoked.

It seems to be in deference to this principle that Eliot famously described the play Hamlet as "most certainly an artistic failure": Eliot felt that Hamlet's strong emotions "exceeded the facts" of the play, which is to say they were not supported by an "objective correlative". He acknowledged that such a circumstance is "something which every person of sensibility has known," but felt that in trying to represent it dramatically, "Shakespeare tackled a problem which proved too much for him".

== Criticisms ==
One possible criticism of Eliot's theory includes his assumption that an author's intentions concerning expression will be understood in one way only. This point is stated by Balachandra Rajan as quoted in David A. Goldfarb's "New Reference Works in Literary Theory" with these words: "Eliot argues that there is a verbal formula for any given state of emotion which, when found and used, will evoke that state and no other."

== Examples ==
A famous haiku by Yosa Buson, entitled The Piercing Chill I Feel, illustrates the use of objective correlative within poetry:

The piercing chill I feel:
my dead wife's comb, in our bedroom,
under my heel...

In the Clint Eastwood movie Jersey Boys, songwriter Bob Gaudio of The Four Seasons is asked who the girl is in his song Cry For Me. He refers to T.S. Eliot's topic, "the Objective Correlative", as the subject being every girl, or any girl. In adherence to this reference, the author allows himself the literary license to step outside the scope of his personal experience and to conjecture about the emotions and responses inherent in the situation, utilizing a third-party perspective in the first-person presentation.

== See also ==
- Affect
- Pathetic fallacy
- Show, don't tell
- Thing theory
