= Hamlet and His Problems =

1919 critique essay by T.S. Eliot

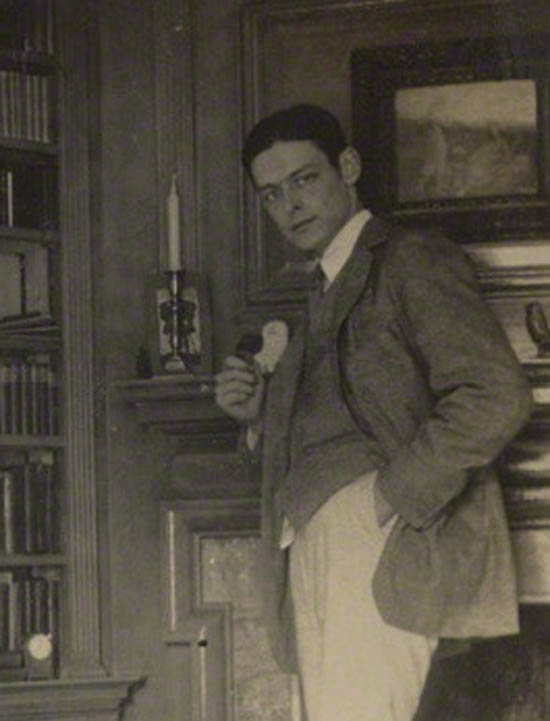
T. S. Eliot in 1920 (photograph by Ottoline Morrell)

"Hamlet and His Problems" is an essay written by T. S. Eliot in 1919 that offers a critical reading of Hamlet. The essay first appeared in Eliot's The Sacred Wood: Essays on Poetry and Criticism in 1920. It was later reprinted by Faber & Faber in 1932 in Selected Essays, 1917-1932. Eliot's critique gained attention partly due to his claim that Hamlet is "most certainly an artistic failure." Eliot also popularised the concept of the objective correlative—a mechanism used to evoke emotion in an audience—in the essay. The essay is also an example of Eliot's use of what became known as new criticism.

== Content ==
Eliot begins the essay by stating that the primary problem of Hamlet is actually the play itself, with its main character being only a secondary issue. Eliot goes on to note that the play enjoys critical success because the character of Hamlet appeals to a particular kind of creatively minded critic. According to Eliot, a creative-minded individual who directs his energy toward criticism projects his own character onto Hamlet. As a result, the critic becomes biased in favor of and fixated on the character. Eliot accuses Johann Wolfgang von Goethe and Samuel Taylor Coleridge of this, stating that Goethe's critique turns Shakespeare's tragic hero into his own Werther while Coleridge's "Lecture on Hamlet" made Hamlet into a Coleridge. Eliot wrote that due to their fixation on Hamlet rather than the play as a whole, the type of criticism that Coleridge and Goethe produced is "the most misleading kind possible".

Eliot follows this by praising J.M. Robertson and Elmer Edgar Stoll for publishing critiques that focus on the larger scope of the play. He argues that a creative work cannot be interpreted, only criticized according to a standard or in comparison to another work. The function of interpretation in this argument is to make the reader aware of relevant historical information that they are not assumed to know. Eliot credits Robertson in particular for his historical interpretation of Hamlet.

Next, Eliot names three sources on which he believes Shakespeare to have based his play: Thomas Kyd's The Spanish Tragedy, the so-called Ur-Hamlet (which he attributes to Kyd), and a version of the play performed in Germany during Shakespeare's lifetime. He notes the differences between Hamlet and its supposed source material, pointing out that in the earlier works the only motive for murder is revenge, the delay of which is the result of circumventing the king's guards. The Hamlet of the supposed earlier play also uses his perceived madness as a guise to escape suspicion. Eliot believes that in Shakespeare's version, however, Hamlet is driven by a motive greater than revenge, his delay in exacting revenge is left unexplained, and that Hamlet's madness is meant to arouse the king's suspicion rather than avoid it. Eliot finds these alterations too incomplete to be convincing, and feels that the prose of the two texts is so similar in some sections that it appears that Shakespeare simply revised Kyd's text. Eliot concludes this section by agreeing with Robertson's assertion that the hero of Hamlet is driven more by his mother's guilt than revenge for the father, and Shakespeare fell short in combining this altered motive with his source material.

The latter portion of the essay is dedicated to Eliot's criticism of Hamlet based on his concept of the objective correlative. He begins by arguing that the greatest contributor to the play's failure is Shakespeare's inability to express Hamlet's emotion in his surroundings and the audience's resultant inability to localize that emotion. The madness of Shakespeare's character, according to Eliot, is a result of the inexpressible things that Hamlet feels and the playwright cannot convey. Eliot concludes that because Shakespeare cannot find a sufficient objective correlative for his hero, the audience is left without a means to understand an experience that Shakespeare himself does not seem to understand.

== Objective correlative ==
The objective correlative concept that Eliot popularized in this essay refers to the concept that the only way to express an emotion through art is to find "a set of objects, a situation, [or] a chain of events" that will, when read or performed, evoke a specific sensory experience in the audience. This sensory experience is meant to help the reader understand the mental or emotional state of a character. Eliot writes that Hamlet's state of mind is a direct result of his confused emotions and the lack of external representation for these emotions in an objective correlative. He goes on to say that Hamlet's initial conflict is a disgust in his mother, but his feelings regarding the situation are too complex to be represented by Gertrude alone. Neither Hamlet nor Shakespeare can grasp or objectify these feelings, and so it acts as an obstacle to the character's revenge and Shakespeare's plot. But Eliot points out that if Shakespeare had found an objective correlative for Hamlet's internal conflict, the play would be entirely changed because the bafflement that characterizes it is a direct result of Shakespeare's shortcomings in this respect.

Eliot does, however, give credit to Shakespeare's use of the objective correlative in his other works. As an example, he references a scene in Macbeth in which Lady Macbeth is sleepwalking and the imagined sensory impressions Shakespeare provides allow the audience to understand her mental state.

== Criticism ==
One critical objection to Eliot's essay is that although Eliot begins "Hamlet and His Problems" with a complaint against critics that conflate Hamlet and its hero, he then spends a large portion of the essay focused on Hamlet the character and his effect on the play. It has been noted that if Eliot's intent was to focus his critique on the play, he could have titled his essay "Hamlet and Its Problems" instead. Some critics have also pointed out that Eliot offers no formal critique or concrete suggestions of how to improve the play.

Although many critics credit Eliot's concept of the objective correlative, some take issue with his discussion of the subject in this essay. Some critics argue that no individual can say with certainty what emotion Shakespeare intended to convey in Hamlet, and thus cannot attack Shakespeare for failing to express it. Others also feel that Eliot's critique of the play is too driven by his modernist views and that he takes Hamlet too much at face value.
