= T. S. Eliot =

Poet, essayist and playwright (1888–1965)

T. S. Eliot OM
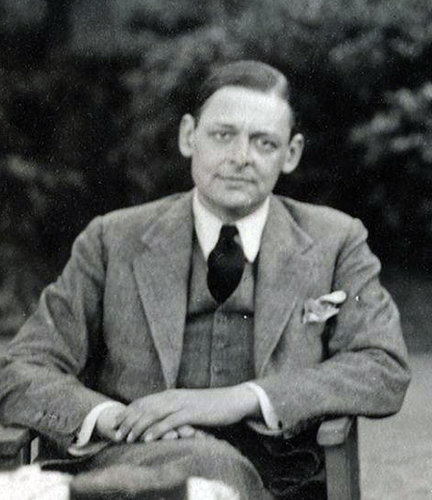
- Eliot in 1934
- Born: Thomas Stearns Eliot; 26 September 1888; St. Louis, Missouri, U.S.
- Died: 4 January 1965 (aged 76); London, England, U.K.
- Citizenship: United States (until 1927); United Kingdom (from 1927)
- Education: Harvard University (AB, AM)
- Occupations: Poet; essayist; playwright
- Spouses: Vivienne Haigh-Wood (m. 1915; sep. 1933); Esmé Valerie Fletcher (m. 1957)
- Parents: Henry Ware Eliot; Charlotte Champe Stearns
- Family: Eliot
- Writing career
- Works: Full list
- Notable awards: Nobel Prize in Literature (1948)
- Movement: Modernism

Thomas Stearns Eliot (26 September 1888 – 4 January 1965) was a poet, essayist and playwright. He was a leading figure of modernist poetry in the English language where he altered the art through his writing style, verse structure and use of pessimistic language. Awarded the 1948 Nobel Prize in Literature, he is considered one of the greatest poets of the English language. He is also noted for his critical essays, which often re-evaluated long-held cultural beliefs.

Born in St. Louis, Missouri, United States, to a prominent Boston Brahmin family, he moved to the United Kingdom in 1914 at the age of 25 and went on to settle, work, and marry there. He became a British subject in 1927 at the age of 39, converted to Anglicanism, and renounced his American citizenship.

Eliot first attracted widespread attention for "The Love Song of J. Alfred Prufrock" (1915), which, at the time of its publication, was considered outlandish. It was followed by The Waste Land (1922), "The Hollow Men" (1925), Ash Wednesday (1930), and Four Quartets (1943). He wrote seven plays, including Murder in the Cathedral (1935) and The Cocktail Party (1949). He was awarded the 1948 Nobel Prize in Literature "for his outstanding, pioneer contribution to present-day poetry".

== Life ==
=== Early life and education ===
The Eliots were originally a New England-based Boston Brahmin family, with Old Stock roots of English descent. Eliot's paternal grandfather, William Greenleaf Eliot, had moved from New Bedford, Massachusetts to St. Louis, Missouri, to establish a Unitarian Christian church there. His father, Henry Ware Eliot, was a successful businessman, president and treasurer of the Hydraulic-Press Brick Company in St. Louis. His mother, Charlotte Champe Stearns, who wrote poetry, was a social worker, then a new profession in the US. Eliot was the last of six surviving children.

Known to family and friends as Tom, he was the namesake of his maternal grandfather, Thomas Stearns. Eliot lived in St. Louis for the first 16 years of his life at the house on Locust Street where he was born. After going away to school in 1905, he returned to St. Louis only for holidays and visits. Despite moving away from the city, Eliot wrote to a friend that "Missouri and the Mississippi have made a deeper impression on me than any other part of the world."

Eliot was drawn to literature in childhood. Struggling from a congenital double inguinal hernia, he could not participate in many physical activities. Often isolated, his love for literature developed. Once he learned to read, the young boy immediately became obsessed with books, favouring tales of savage life, the Wild West, or Mark Twain's Tom Sawyer. In his memoir about Eliot, his friend Robert Sencourt comments that the young Eliot "would often curl up in the window-seat behind an enormous book, setting the drug of dreams against the pain of living." Eliot credited his hometown with fuelling his literary vision: "It is self-evident that St. Louis affected me more deeply than any other environment has ever done. I feel that there is something in having passed one's childhood beside the big river, which is incommunicable to those people who have not. I consider myself fortunate to have been born here, rather than in Boston, or New York, or London."

From 1898 to 1905, Eliot attended Smith Academy, the boys college preparatory division of Washington University, where his studies included Ancient Greek, Latin, French, and German. He began to write poetry when he was 14, under the influence of Edward FitzGerald's translation of the Rubaiyat of Omar Khayyam. He said the results were gloomy and despairing and he destroyed them. His first published poem, "A Fable For Feasters", was written as a school exercise and was published in the Smith Academy Record in February 1905. Also published there in April 1905 was his oldest surviving poem in manuscript, an untitled lyric, later revised and reprinted as "Song" in The Harvard Advocate. He published three short stories in 1905, "Birds of Prey", "A Tale of a Whale" and "The Man Who Was King". The last mentioned story reflected his exploration of the Igorot Village while visiting the 1904 St. Louis World's Fair. His interest in indigenous peoples thus predated his anthropological studies at Harvard University.

Following graduation from Smith Academy, Eliot attended Milton Academy in Massachusetts for a preparatory year, where he met Scofield Thayer, who later published The Waste Land. He studied at Harvard College from 1906 to 1909, earning a Bachelor of Arts in an elective programme similar to comparative literature in 1909 and a Master of Arts in English literature the following year. Because of his year at Milton Academy, Eliot was allowed to earn his Bachelor of Arts after three years instead of the usual four. Frank Kermode writes that the most important moment of Eliot's undergraduate career was in 1908 when he discovered Arthur Symons's The Symbolist Movement in Literature. This introduced him to Jules Laforgue, Arthur Rimbaud and Paul Verlaine. Without Verlaine, Eliot wrote, he might never have heard of Tristan Corbière and his book Les amours jaunes, a work that affected the course of Eliot's life. The Harvard Advocate published some of his poems and he became lifelong friends with Conrad Aiken.

After working as a philosophy assistant at Harvard from 1909 to 1910, Eliot moved to Paris where, from 1910 to 1911, he studied philosophy at the University of Paris. He attended lectures by Henri Bergson and read poetry with Alain-Fournier. From 1911 to 1914, he was back at Harvard studying Indian philosophy and Sanskrit. While a member of the Harvard Graduate School, Eliot fell in love with Emily Hale. Eliot was awarded a scholarship to Merton College, Oxford, in 1914. He first visited Marburg in the German Empire, where he planned to take a summer programme, but when the First World War broke out he went to the University of Oxford instead. At the time so many American students attended Merton that the Junior Common Room proposed a motion "that this society abhors the Americanization of Oxford". It was defeated by two votes after Eliot reminded the students how much they owed American culture.

Eliot wrote to Conrad Aiken on New Year's Eve 1914: "I hate university towns and university people, who are the same everywhere, with pregnant wives, sprawling children, many books and hideous pictures on the walls [...] Oxford is very pretty, but I don't like to be dead." Leaving Oxford, Eliot spent much of his time in London. This city had a monumental and life-altering effect on Eliot for several reasons, the most significant of which was his introduction to the influential American poet Ezra Pound. A connection through Aiken resulted in an arranged meeting and on 22 September 1914, Eliot paid a visit to Pound's flat. Pound instantly deemed Eliot "worth watching" and was crucial to Eliot's fledgling career as a poet, as he is credited with promoting Eliot through social events and literary gatherings. Thus, according to biographer John Worthen, during his time in England Eliot "was seeing as little of Oxford as possible". He was instead spending long periods of time in London, in the company of Pound and "some of the modern artists whom the war has so far spared [...] It was Pound who helped most, introducing him everywhere." In the end, Eliot did not settle at Merton and left after a year. In 1915 he taught English at Birkbeck College, University of London.

In 1916 he completed a doctoral dissertation for Harvard on "Knowledge and Experience in the Philosophy of F. H. Bradley", but failed to return for the viva voce examination.

=== Marriage ===
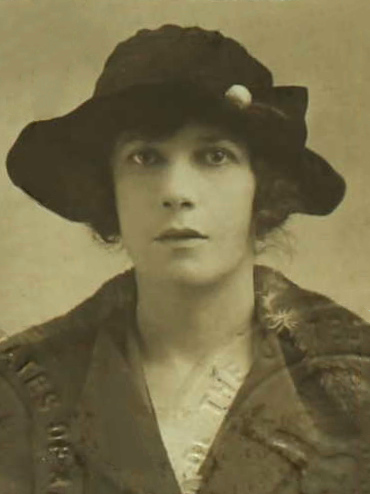
Vivienne Haigh-Wood Eliot, passport photograph from 1920

Before leaving the US, Eliot had told Emily Hale that he was in love with her. He exchanged letters with her from Oxford during 1914 and 1915, but they did not meet again until 1927. In a letter to Aiken late in December 1914, Eliot, aged 26, wrote: "I am very dependent upon women (I mean female society)." Less than four months later, Thayer introduced Eliot to Vivienne Haigh-Wood, a Cambridge governess. They were married at Hampstead Register Office on 26 June 1915.

After a short visit, alone, to his family in the United States, Eliot returned to London and took several teaching jobs. The philosopher Bertrand Russell took an interest in Vivienne while the newlyweds stayed in his flat. Some scholars have suggested that she and Russell had an affair, but the allegations were never confirmed.

The marriage seems to have been markedly unhappy, in part because of Vivienne's health problems. In a letter addressed to Ezra Pound, she covers an extensive list of her symptoms, which included a recurrent high temperature, fatigue, insomnia, migraines, and colitis. This, coupled with apparent mental instability, meant that she was often sent away by Eliot and her doctors for extended periods in the hope of improving her health. As time went on, he became increasingly detached from her. According to witnesses, both Eliots were frequent complainers of illness, physical and mental, while Eliot would drink excessively and Vivienne is said to have developed a liking for opium and ether, drugs prescribed for medical issues. It is claimed that the couple's wearying behaviour caused some visitors to vow never to spend another evening in the company of both together. The couple separated in 1932 and formally separated in 1933; in 1938 Vivienne's brother Maurice had her committed to a mental hospital against her will, where she remained until her death of heart disease in 1947. When told via a phone call from the asylum that Vivienne had died unexpectedly during the night, Eliot is said to have buried his face in his hands and cried out 'Oh God, oh God.'

Their relationship became the subject of a 1984 play, Tom & Viv, which in 1994 was adapted as a film.

In a private paper written in his sixties, Eliot confessed: "I came to persuade myself that I was in love with Vivienne simply because I wanted to burn my boats and commit myself to staying in England. And she persuaded herself (also under the influence of [Ezra] Pound) that she would save the poet by keeping him in England. To her, the marriage brought no happiness. To me, it brought the state of mind out of which came The Waste Land."

=== Teaching, banking, and publishing ===
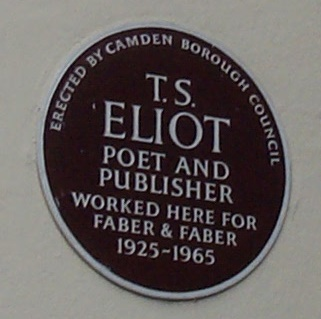
A plaque at SOAS's Faber Building, 24 Russell Square, London

After leaving Merton, Eliot worked as a schoolteacher, notably at Highgate School in London, where he taught French and Latin; his students included John Betjeman. He subsequently taught at the Royal Grammar School, High Wycombe in Buckinghamshire. To earn extra money, he wrote book reviews and lectured at evening extension courses at University College London and Oxford. In 1917 he took a position at Lloyds Bank in London, working on foreign accounts. On a trip to Paris in August 1920 with the artist Wyndham Lewis, he met James Joyce. Eliot said he found Joyce arrogant, and Joyce doubted Eliot's ability as a poet at the time, but the two writers soon became friends, with Eliot visiting Joyce whenever he was in Paris. Eliot and Wyndham Lewis also maintained a close friendship, leading to Lewis's later making his well-known portrait painting of Eliot in 1938.

Charles Whibley recommended Eliot to Geoffrey Faber. In 1925 Eliot left Lloyds to become a director in the publishing firm Faber and Gwyer (later Faber & Faber), where he remained for the rest of his career. At Faber & Faber, he was responsible for publishing distinguished English poets, including W. H. Auden, Stephen Spender, Charles Madge and Ted Hughes.

=== Conversion to Anglicanism and British citizenship ===
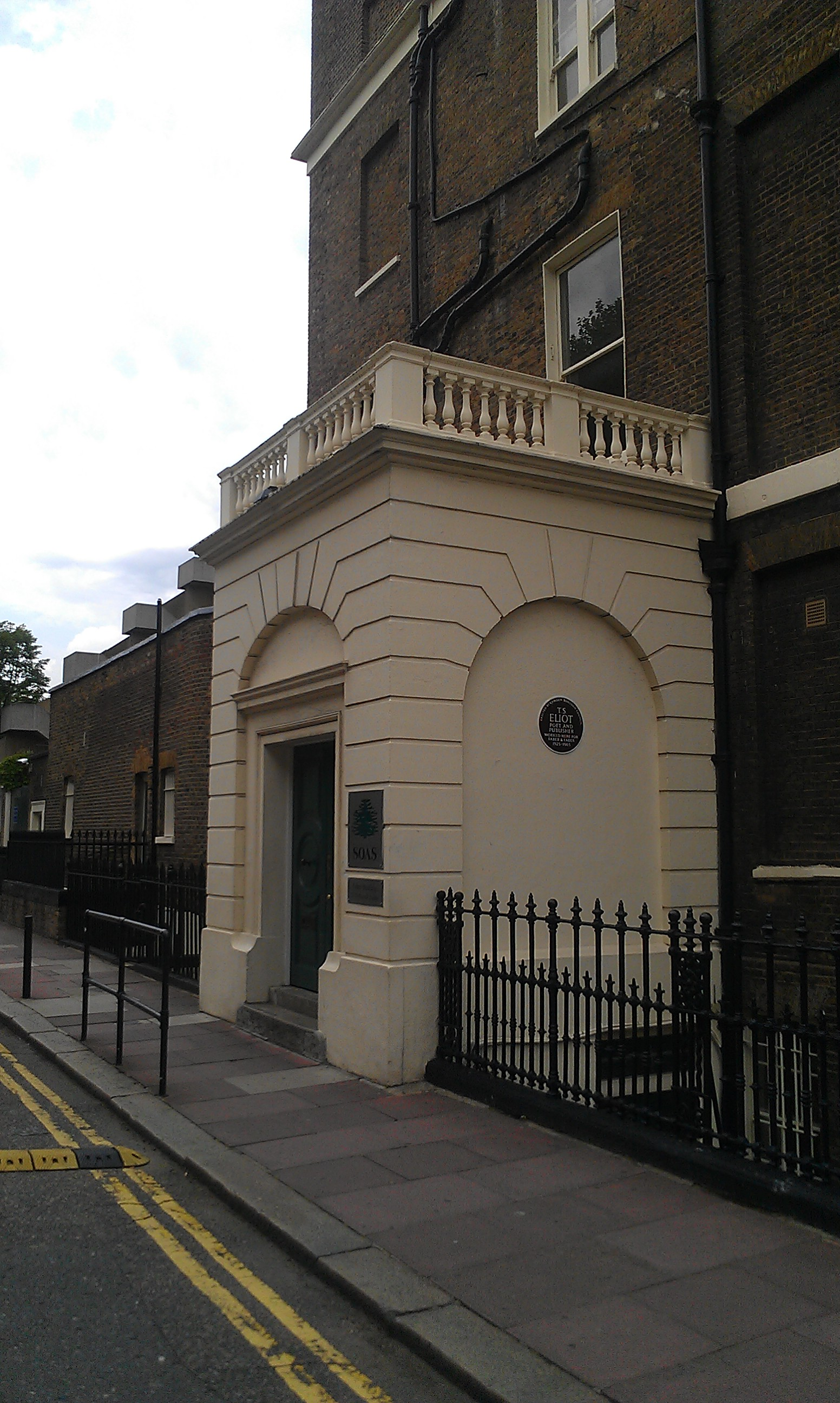
The Faber & Faber building where Eliot worked from 1925 to 1965; the commemorative plaque is under the right-hand arch.

On 29 June 1927 Eliot converted from Unitarianism to Anglicanism, and in November that year he took British citizenship, thereby renouncing his United States citizenship in the event he had not officially done so previously. He became a churchwarden of his parish church, St Stephen's, Gloucester Road, London, and a life member of the Society of King Charles the Martyr. He specifically identified as Anglo-Catholic, proclaiming himself "classicist in literature, royalist in politics, and anglo-catholic in religion".

About 30 years later Eliot commented on his religious views that he combined "a Catholic cast of mind, a Calvinist heritage, and a Puritanical temperament". He also had wider spiritual interests, commenting that "I see the path of progress for modern man in his occupation with his own self, with his inner being" and citing Johann Wolfgang von Goethe and Rudolf Steiner as exemplars of such a direction.

One of Eliot's biographers, Peter Ackroyd, commented that "the purposes of [Eliot's conversion] were two-fold. One: the Church of England offered Eliot some hope for himself, and I think Eliot needed some resting place. But secondly, it attached Eliot to the English community and English culture."

=== Separation and remarriage ===
By 1932, Eliot had been contemplating a separation from his wife for some time. When Harvard offered him the Charles Eliot Norton professorship for the 1932–1933 academic year, he accepted and left Vivienne in England. Upon his return, he arranged for a formal separation from her, avoiding all but one meeting with her between his leaving for America in 1932 and her death in 1947. Vivienne was committed to the Northumberland House mental hospital in Woodberry Down, Manor House, London, in 1938, and remained there until she died. Although Eliot was still legally her husband, he never visited her. From 1933 to 1946 Eliot had a close emotional relationship with Emily Hale. Eliot later destroyed Hale's letters to him, but Hale donated Eliot's to Princeton University Library where they were sealed, following Eliot's and Hale's wishes, for 50 years after both had died, until 2020. When Eliot heard of the donation he deposited his own account of their relationship with Harvard University to be opened whenever the Princeton letters were.

From 1938 to 1957 Eliot's public companion was Mary Trevelyan of London University, who wanted to marry him and left a detailed memoir.

From 1946 to 1957, Eliot shared a flat at 19 Carlyle Mansions, Chelsea, with his friend John Davy Hayward, who collected and managed Eliot's papers, styling himself "Keeper of the Eliot Archive". Hayward also collected Eliot's pre-Prufrock verse, commercially published after Eliot's death as Poems Written in Early Youth. When Eliot and Hayward separated their household in 1957, Hayward retained his collection of Eliot's papers, which he bequeathed to King's College, Cambridge, in 1965.

On 10 January 1957, at the age of 68, Eliot married Esmé Valerie Fletcher, who was 30. In contrast to his first marriage, Eliot knew Fletcher well, as she had been his secretary at Faber & Faber since August 1949. They kept their wedding secret; the ceremony was held in St Barnabas Church, Kensington, London, at 6:15 am with virtually no one in attendance other than his wife's parents. In the early 1960s, by then in failing health, Eliot worked as an editor for the Wesleyan University Press, seeking new poets in Europe for publication. After Eliot's death, Valerie dedicated her time to preserving his legacy, by editing and annotating The Letters of T. S. Eliot and a facsimile of the draft of The Waste Land. Valerie Eliot died on 9 November 2012 at her home in London.

Eliot had no children with either of his wives.

=== Death and honours ===
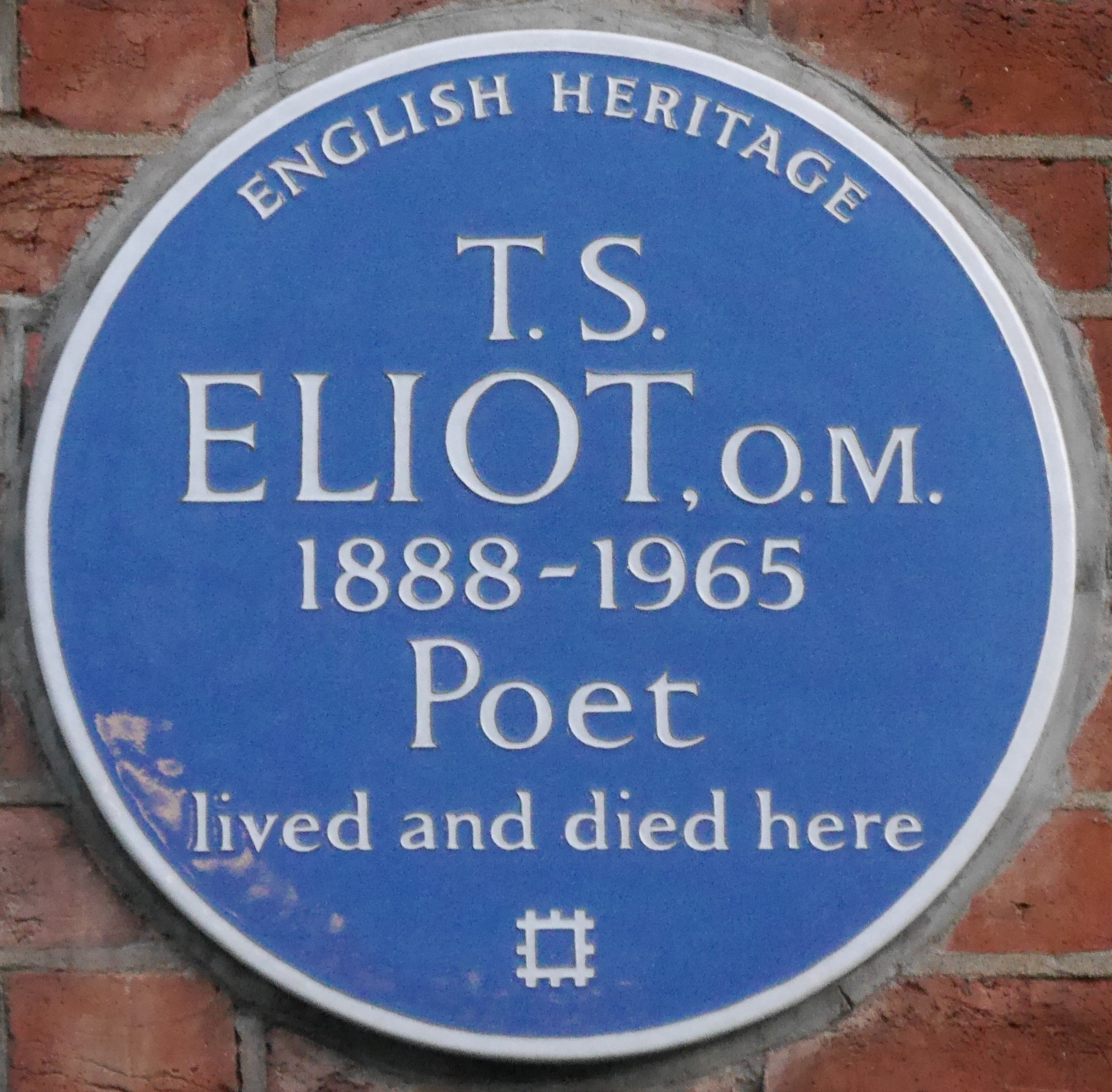
Blue plaque, 3 Kensington Court Gardens, Kensington, London, home from 1957 until his death in 1965

Eliot died of emphysema at his home in Kensington in London, on 4 January 1965, and was cremated at Golders Green Crematorium. In accordance with his wishes, his ashes were taken to St Michael and All Angels' Church, East Coker, the village in Somerset from which his Eliot ancestors had emigrated to America. A wall plaque in the church commemorates him with a quotation from his poem East Coker: "In my beginning is my end. In my end is my beginning."

In 1967, on the second anniversary of his death, Eliot was commemorated by the placement of a large stone in the floor of Poets' Corner in Westminster Abbey. The stone, cut by the designer Reynolds Stone, is inscribed with his life dates, his Order of Merit, and a quotation from his poem Little Gidding, "the communication / of the dead is tongued with fire beyond / the language of the living."

In 1986 a blue plaque was placed on the building – No. 3 Kensington Court Gardens – where he lived and died.

== Poetry ==
For a poet of his stature, Eliot produced relatively few poems. He was aware of this even early in his career; he wrote to J. H. Woods, one of his former Harvard professors, "My reputation in London is built upon one small volume of verse, and is kept up by printing two or three more poems in a year. The only thing that matters is that these should be perfect in their kind, so that each should be an event."

Typically, Eliot first published his poems individually in periodicals or in small books or pamphlets and then collected them in books. His first collection was Prufrock and Other Observations (1917). In 1920, he published more poems in Ara Vos Prec (London) and Poems: 1920 (New York). These had the same poems (in a different order) except that "Ode" in the British edition was replaced with "Hysteria" in the American edition. In 1925, he collected The Waste Land and the poems in Prufrock and Poems into one volume and added The Hollow Men to form Poems: 1909–1925. From then on, he updated this work as Collected Poems. Exceptions are Old Possum's Book of Practical Cats (1939), a collection of light verse; Poems Written in Early Youth, posthumously published in 1967 and consisting mainly of poems published between 1907 and 1910 in The Harvard Advocate, and Inventions of the March Hare: Poems 1909–1917, material Eliot never intended to have published, which appeared posthumously in 1996.

During an interview in 1959, Eliot said of his nationality and its role in his work: "I'd say that my poetry has obviously more in common with my distinguished contemporaries in America than with anything written in my generation in England. That I'm sure of. ... It wouldn't be what it is, and I imagine it wouldn't be so good; putting it as modestly as I can, it wouldn't be what it is if I'd been born in England, and it wouldn't be what it is if I'd stayed in America. It's a combination of things. But in its sources, in its emotional springs, it comes from America."

Cleo McNelly Kearns notes in her biography that Eliot was deeply influenced by Indic traditions, notably the Upanishads. From the Sanskrit ending of The Waste Land to the "What Krishna meant" section of Four Quartets shows how much Indic religions and more specifically Hinduism made up the philosophical basis for his thought process. It must also be acknowledged, as Chinmoy Guha showed in his book Where the Dreams Cross: T S Eliot and French Poetry (Macmillan, 2011) that he was deeply influenced by French poets from Baudelaire to Paul Valéry. He himself wrote in his 1940 essay on W. B. Yeats: "The kind of poetry that I needed to teach me the use of my own voice did not exist in English at all; it was only to be found in French." ("Yeats", On Poetry and Poets, 1948).

=== "The Love Song of J. Alfred Prufrock" ===
In 1915 Ezra Pound, overseas editor of Poetry magazine, recommended to Harriet Monroe, the magazine's founder, that she should publish "The Love Song of J. Alfred Prufrock". Although the character Prufrock seems to be middle-aged, Eliot wrote most of the poem when he was only twenty-two. Its now-famous opening lines, comparing the evening sky to "a patient etherised upon a table", were considered shocking and offensive, especially at a time when Georgian Poetry was hailed for its derivations of the 19th-century Romantic poets.

The poem's structure was heavily influenced by Eliot's extensive reading of Dante Alighieri and refers to a number of literary works, including William Shakespeare's play Hamlet and those of the French Symbolists. Its reception in London can be gauged from an unsigned review in The Times Literary Supplement on 21 June 1917. "The fact that these things occurred to the mind of Mr. Eliot is surely of the very smallest importance to anyone, even to himself. They certainly have no relation to poetry."

=== The Waste Land ===
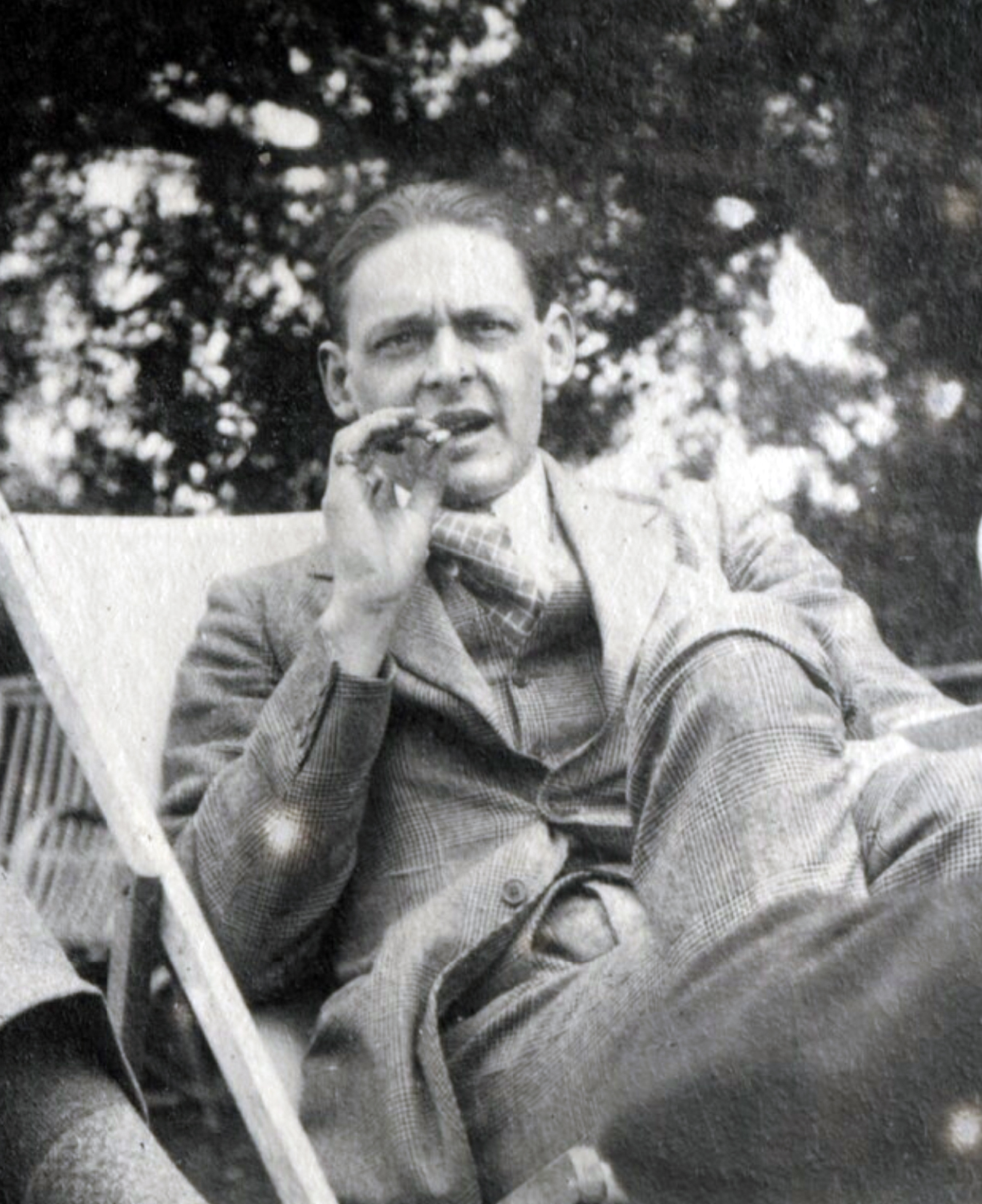
Eliot in 1923 by Lady Ottoline Morrell

In October 1922 Eliot published The Waste Land in The Criterion. His dedication to il miglior fabbro ('the better craftsman') refers to Pound's significant hand in editing and reshaping the poem from a longer manuscript to the shortened version that appears in publication.

It was composed during a period of personal difficulty for Eliot—his marriage was failing, and both he and Vivienne were suffering from nervous disorders. Before the poem's publication as a book in December 1922, Eliot distanced himself from its vision of despair. On 15 November 1922 he wrote to Richard Aldington saying, "As for The Waste Land, that is a thing of the past so far as I am concerned and I am now feeling toward a new form and style."

The poem is often read as a representation of the disillusionment of the post-war generation. Dismissing this view, Eliot commented in 1931, "When I wrote a poem called The Waste Land, some of the more approving critics said that I had expressed 'the disillusion of a generation', which is nonsense. I may have expressed for them their own illusion of being disillusioned, but that did not form part of my intention."

The poem is known for its disjointed nature due to its usage of allusion and quotation and its abrupt changes of speaker, location, and time. This structural complexity is one of the reasons that the poem has become a touchstone of modern literature, a poetic counterpart to a novel published in the same year, James Joyce's Ulysses.

Among its best-known phrases are "April is the cruellest month", "I will show you fear in a handful of dust", and "These fragments I have shored against my ruins".

=== "The Hollow Men" ===
"The Hollow Men" appeared in 1925. For the critic Edmund Wilson, it marked "The nadir of the phase of despair and desolation given such effective expression in 'The Waste Land'." It is Eliot's major poem of the late 1920s. Similar to Eliot's other works, its themes are overlapping and fragmentary. Post-war Europe under the Treaty of Versailles (which Eliot despised), the difficulty of hope and religious conversion, Eliot's failed marriage.

Allen Tate perceived a shift in Eliot's method, writing, "The mythologies disappear altogether in 'The Hollow Men'." This is a striking claim for a poem as indebted to Dante as anything else in Eliot's early work, to say little of the modern English mythology—the "Old Guy Fawkes" of the Gunpowder Plot—or the colonial and agrarian mythos of Joseph Conrad and James George Frazer, which, at least for reasons of textual history, echo in The Waste Land. The "continuous parallel between contemporaneity and antiquity" that is so characteristic of his mythical method remained in fine form. "The Hollow Men" contains some of Eliot's most famous lines, notably its conclusion:

This is the way the world ends
Not with a bang but a whimper.

=== "Ash-Wednesday" ===
"Ash-Wednesday" is the first long poem written by Eliot after his 1927 conversion to Anglicanism. Published in 1930, it deals with the struggle that ensues when a person who has lacked faith acquires it. Sometimes referred to as Eliot's "conversion poem", it is richly but ambiguously allusive, and deals with the aspiration to move from spiritual barrenness to hope for human salvation. Eliot's style of writing in "Ash-Wednesday" showed a marked shift from the poetry he had written prior to his 1927 conversion, and his post-conversion style continued in a similar vein. His style became less ironic, and the poems were no longer populated by multiple characters in dialogue. Eliot's subject matter also became more focused on his spiritual concerns and his Christian faith.

Many critics were particularly enthusiastic about "Ash-Wednesday". Edwin Muir maintained that it is one of the most moving poems Eliot wrote, and perhaps the "most perfect", though it was not well received by everyone. The poem's groundwork of orthodox Christianity discomfited many of the more secular literati.

=== Old Possum's Book of Practical Cats ===
In 1939 Eliot published a book of light verse, Old Possum's Book of Practical Cats. ("Old Possum" was Ezra Pound's friendly nickname for Eliot.) The first edition had an illustration of the author on the cover. In 1954, the composer Alan Rawsthorne set six of the poems for speaker and orchestra in a work titled Practical Cats. After Eliot's death, the book was the basis of the musical Cats by Andrew Lloyd Webber, first produced in the West End in 1981 and opening on Broadway the following year.

=== Four Quartets ===
Eliot regarded Four Quartets as his masterpiece, and it is the work that most of all led him to being awarded the Nobel Prize in Literature. It consists of four long poems, each first published separately: "Burnt Norton" (1936), "East Coker" (1940), "The Dry Salvages" (1941) and "Little Gidding" (1942). Each has five sections. Although they resist easy characterisation, each poem includes meditations on the nature of time in some important respect—theological, historical, physical—and its relation to the human condition. Each poem is associated with one of the four classical elements, respectively: air, earth, water, and fire.

"Burnt Norton" is a meditative poem that begins with the narrator trying to focus on the present moment while walking through a garden, focusing on images and sounds such as the bird, the roses, clouds and an empty pool. The meditation leads the narrator to reach "the still point" in which there is no attempt to get anywhere or to experience place and/or time, instead experiencing "a grace of sense". In the final section, the narrator contemplates the arts ("words" and "music") as they relate to time. The narrator focuses particularly on the poet's art of manipulating "Words [which] strain, / Crack and sometimes break, under the burden [of time], under the tension, slip, slide, perish, decay with imprecision, [and] will not stay in place, / Will not stay still." By comparison, the narrator concludes that "Love is itself unmoving, / Only the cause and end of movement, / Timeless, and undesiring."

"East Coker" continues the examination of time and meaning, focusing in a famous passage on the nature of language and poetry. Out of darkness, Eliot offers a solution: "I said to my soul, be still, and wait without hope."

"The Dry Salvages" treats the element of water, via images of river and sea. It strives to contain opposites: "The past and future / Are conquered, and reconciled."

"Little Gidding" (the element of fire) is the most anthologised of the Quartets. Eliot's experiences as an air raid warden in the Blitz power the poem, and he imagines meeting Dante during the German bombing. The beginning of the Quartets ("Houses / Are removed, destroyed") had become a violent everyday experience; this creates an animation, where for the first time he talks of love as the driving force behind all experience. From this background, the Quartets ends with an affirmation of Julian of Norwich: "All shall be well and / All manner of thing shall be well."

The Four Quartets draws upon Christian theology, art, symbolism and the language of such figures as Dante, and the mystics John of the Cross and Julian of Norwich.

== Plays ==
With the important exception of Four Quartets, Eliot directed much of his creative energies after Ash Wednesday to writing plays in verse, mostly comedies or plays with redemptive endings. He was long a critic and admirer of Elizabethan and Jacobean verse drama; witness his allusions to John Webster, Thomas Middleton, Shakespeare and Thomas Kyd in The Waste Land. In a 1933 lecture he said "Every poet would like, I fancy, to be able to think that he had some direct social utility . . . . He would like to be something of a popular entertainer and be able to think his own thoughts behind a tragic or a comic mask. He would like to convey the pleasures of poetry, not only to a larger audience but to larger groups of people collectively; and the theatre is the best place in which to do it."

After The Waste Land (1922), he wrote that he was "now feeling toward a new form and style". One project he had in mind was writing a play in verse, using some of the rhythms of early jazz. The play featured "Sweeney", a character who had appeared in a number of his poems. Although Eliot did not finish the play, he did publish two scenes from the piece. These scenes, titled Fragment of a Prologue (1926) and Fragment of an Agon (1927), were published together in 1932 as Sweeney Agonistes. Although Eliot noted that this was not intended to be a one-act play, it is sometimes performed as one.

A pageant play by Eliot called The Rock was performed in 1934 for the benefit of churches in the Diocese of London. Much of it was a collaborative effort; Eliot accepted credit only for the authorship of one scene and the choruses. George Bell, the Bishop of Chichester, had been instrumental in connecting Eliot with the producer E. Martin Browne for the production of The Rock, and later commissioned Eliot to write another play for the Canterbury Festival in 1935. This one, Murder in the Cathedral, concerning the martyrdom of Thomas Becket, was more under Eliot's control. Eliot's biographer Peter Ackroyd comments that "for [Eliot], Murder in the Cathedral and succeeding verse plays offered a double advantage; it allowed him to practice poetry but it also offered a convenient home for his religious sensibility." After this, he worked on more "commercial" plays for more general audiences: The Family Reunion (1939), The Cocktail Party (1949), The Confidential Clerk, (1953) and The Elder Statesman (1958) (the latter three were produced by Henry Sherek and directed by Browne). The Broadway production in New York of The Cocktail Party received the 1950 Tony Award for Best Play. Eliot wrote The Cocktail Party while he was a visiting scholar at the Institute for Advanced Study.

Regarding his method of playwriting, Eliot explained, "If I set out to write a play, I start by an act of choice. I settle upon a particular emotional situation, out of which characters and a plot will emerge. And then lines of poetry may come into being: not from the original impulse but from a secondary stimulation of the unconscious mind."

== Literary criticism ==
Eliot also made significant contributions to the field of literary criticism and strongly influenced the school of New Criticism. He was somewhat self-deprecating and minimising of his work and once said his criticism was merely a "by-product" of his "private poetry-workshop". But the critic William Empson once said, "I do not know for certain how much of my own mind [Eliot] invented, let alone how much of it is a reaction against him or indeed a consequence of misreading him. He is a very penetrating influence, perhaps not unlike the east wind."

In his essay "Tradition and the Individual Talent", Eliot argues that art must be understood not in a vacuum, but in the context of previous works of art. "In a peculiar sense [an artist or poet] ... must inevitably be judged by the standards of the past." This essay had an important influence on the New Criticism by introducing the idea that the value of a work of art must be viewed in the context of the artist's previous works, a "simultaneous order" of works (i.e., "tradition"). Eliot himself employed this concept in many of his works, especially in The Waste Land.

Also important to New Criticism was the idea—as articulated in Eliot's essay "Hamlet and His Problems"—of an "objective correlative", which posits a connection among the words of the text and events, states of mind, and experiences. This notion concedes that a poem means what it says, but suggests that there can be a non-subjective judgement based on different readers' different—but perhaps corollary—interpretations of a work.

More generally, New Critics took a cue from Eliot in regard to his "'classical' ideals and his religious thought; his attention to the poetry and drama of the early seventeenth century; his deprecation of the Romantics, especially Percy Shelley; his proposition that good poems constitute 'not a turning loose of emotion but an escape from emotion'; and his insistence that 'poets ... at present must be difficult'."

Eliot's essays were a major factor in the revival of interest in the metaphysical poets. Eliot particularly praised the metaphysical poets' ability to show experience as both psychological and sensual, while at the same time infusing this portrayal with—in Eliot's view—wit and uniqueness. Eliot's essay "The Metaphysical Poets", along with giving new significance and attention to metaphysical poetry, introduced his now well-known definition of "unified sensibility", which is considered by some to mean the same thing as the term "metaphysical".

His 1922 poem The Waste Land also can be better understood in light of his work as a critic. He had argued that a poet must write "programmatic criticism", that is, a poet should write to advance his own interests rather than to advance "historical scholarship". Viewed from Eliot's critical lens, The Waste Land likely shows his personal despair about the First World War rather than an objective historical understanding of it.

Late in his career, Eliot focused much of his creative energy on writing for the theatre; some of his earlier critical writing, in essays such as "Poetry and Drama", "Hamlet and his Problems", and "The Possibility of a Poetic Drama", focused on the aesthetics of writing drama in verse.

== Critical reception ==
=== Responses to his poetry ===
The writer Ronald Bush noted that Eliot's early poems like "The Love Song of J. Alfred Prufrock", "Portrait of a Lady", "La Figlia Che Piange", "Preludes", and "Rhapsody on a Windy Night" had "[an] effect [that] was both unique and compelling, and their assurance staggered [Eliot's] contemporaries who were privileged to read them in manuscript. [Conrad] Aiken, for example, marveled at 'how sharp and complete and sui generis the whole thing was, from the outset. The wholeness is there, from the very beginning.'"

The initial critical response to Eliot's The Waste Land was mixed. Bush noted that the piece was at first correctly perceived as a work of jazz-like syncopation—and, like 1920s jazz, essentially iconoclastic." Some critics, like Edmund Wilson, Conrad Aiken, and Gilbert Seldes, thought it was the best poetry being written in the English language while others thought it was esoteric and wilfully difficult. Edmund Wilson, being one of the critics who praised Eliot, called him "one of our only authentic poets". Wilson also pointed out some of Eliot's weaknesses as a poet. In regard to The Waste Land, Wilson admits its flaws ("its lack of structural unity"), but concluded, "I doubt whether there is a single other poem of equal length by a contemporary American which displays so high and so varied a mastery of English verse."

Charles Powell was critical in his assessment of Eliot, calling his poems incomprehensible. And the writers of Time magazine were similarly baffled by a challenging poem like The Waste Land. John Crowe Ransom wrote negative criticisms of Eliot's work but also had positive things to say. For instance, though Ransom negatively criticised The Waste Land for its "extreme disconnection", Ransom was not completely condemnatory of Eliot's work and admitted that Eliot was a talented poet.

Addressing some of the common criticisms directed against The Waste Land at the time, Gilbert Seldes stated, "It seems at first sight remarkably disconnected and confused... [however] a closer view of the poem does more than illuminate the difficulties; it reveals the hidden form of the work, [and] indicates how each thing falls into place."

Eliot's reputation as a poet, as well as his influence in the academy, peaked following the publication of The Four Quartets. In an essay on Eliot published in 1989, the writer Cynthia Ozick refers to this peak of influence (from the 1940s through the early 1960s) as "the Age of Eliot" when Eliot "seemed pure zenith, a colossus, nothing less than a permanent luminary, fixed in the firmament like the sun and the moon". But during this post-war period, others, like Ronald Bush, observed that this time also marked the beginning of the decline in Eliot's literary influence:

As Eliot's conservative religious and political convictions began to seem less congenial in the postwar world, other readers reacted with suspicion to his assertions of authority, obvious in Four Quartets and implicit in the earlier poetry. The result, fueled by intermittent rediscovery of Eliot's occasional anti-Semitic rhetoric, has been a progressive downward revision of his once towering reputation.

Bush also notes that Eliot's reputation "slipped" significantly further after his death. He writes, "Sometimes regarded as too academic (William Carlos Williams's view), Eliot was also frequently criticized for a deadening neoclassicism (as he himself—perhaps just as unfairly—had criticized Milton). However, the multifarious tributes from practicing poets of many schools published during his centenary in 1988 was a strong indication of the intimidating continued presence of his poetic voice."

Literary scholars, such as Harold Bloom and Stephen Greenblatt, acknowledge Eliot's poetry as central to the literary English canon. For instance, the editors of The Norton Anthology of English Literature write, "There is no disagreement on [Eliot's] importance as one of the great renovators of the English poetry dialect, whose influence on a whole generation of poets, critics, and intellectuals generally was enormous. [However] his range as a poet [was] limited, and his interest in the great middle ground of human experience (as distinct from the extremes of saint and sinner) [was] deficient." Despite this criticism, these scholars also acknowledge "[Eliot's] poetic cunning, his fine craftsmanship, his original accent, his historical and representative importance as the poet of the modern symbolist-Metaphysical tradition".

=== Antisemitism ===
The depiction of Jews in some of Eliot's poems has led several critics to accuse him of antisemitism, most forcefully Anthony Julius in his book T. S. Eliot, Anti-Semitism, and Literary Form (1996). In "Gerontion", Eliot writes, in the voice of the poem's elderly narrator, "And the jew squats on the window sill, the owner [of my building] / Spawned in some estaminet of Antwerp." Another example appears in the poem, "Burbank with a Baedeker: Bleistein with a Cigar" in which Eliot wrote, "The rats are underneath the piles. / The jew is underneath the lot. / Money in furs." Julius writes: "The anti-Semitism is unmistakable. It reaches out like a clear signal to the reader." Julius' viewpoint has been supported by Harold Bloom, Christopher Ricks, George Steiner, Tom Paulin and James Fenton.

In lectures delivered at the University of Virginia in 1933 (published in 1934 under the title After Strange Gods: A Primer of Modern Heresy), Eliot wrote of societal tradition and coherence, "What is still more important [than cultural homogeneity] is unity of religious background, and reasons of race and religion combine to make any large number of free-thinking Jews undesirable." Eliot never re-published this book/lecture. In his 1934 pageant play The Rock, Eliot distances himself from Fascist movements of the 1930s by caricaturing Sir Oswald Mosley's Blackshirts, who "firmly refuse/ To descend to palaver with anthropoid Jews". The "new evangels" of totalitarianism are presented as antithetic to the spirit of Christianity.

In In Defence of T. S. Eliot (2001) and T. S. Eliot (2006), Craig Raine defended Eliot from the charge of antisemitism. Paul Dean was not convinced by Raine's argument but nevertheless concluded, "Ultimately, as both Raine and, to do him justice, Julius insist, however much Eliot may have been compromised as a person, as we all are in our several ways, his greatness as a poet remains." The critic Terry Eagleton also questioned the entire basis for Raine's book, writing, "Why do critics feel a need to defend the authors they write on, like doting parents deaf to all criticism of their obnoxious children? Eliot's well-earned reputation [as a poet] is established beyond all doubt, and making him out to be as unflawed as the Archangel Gabriel does him no favours."

== Influence ==
Eliot influenced many poets, novelists, and songwriters, including Seán Ó Ríordáin, Máirtín Ó Díreáin, Virginia Woolf, Ezra Pound, Bob Dylan, Hart Crane, Beryl Price, William Gaddis, Allen Tate, Andrew Lloyd Webber, Trevor Nunn, Ted Hughes, Geoffrey Hill, Seamus Heaney, F. Scott Fitzgerald, Russell Kirk, George Seferis (who in 1936 published a modern Greek translation of The Waste Land) and James Joyce. Eliot was a strong influence on 20th-century Caribbean poetry written in English, including the epic Omeros (1990) by the Nobel laureate Derek Walcott, and Islands (1969) by Barbadian Kamau Brathwaite.

== Honours and awards ==
Below is a partial list of honours and awards received by Eliot or bestowed or created in his honour.

=== National or state honours ===
These honours are displayed in order of precedence based on Eliot's nationality and rules of protocol, not awarding date.

National or State Honours
Order of Merit	United Kingdom	1948
Presidential Medal of Freedom	United States	1964
Officier de la Légion d'honneur	France	1951
Commandeur de l'Ordre des Arts et des Lettres	France	1960

=== Literary awards ===
- Nobel Prize in Literature "for his outstanding, pioneer contribution to present-day poetry" (1948)
- Hanseatic Goethe Prize (of Hamburg) (1955)
- Dante Medal (of Florence) (1959)

=== Drama awards ===
- 1950 Tony Award for Best Play for the Broadway production of The Cocktail Party
- 1983 Tony Award for Best Book of a Musical for his poems used in the musical Cats (posthumous award)
- 1983 Tony Award for Best Original Score for his poems used in the musical Cats (shared with Andrew Lloyd Webber) (posthumous award)

=== Music awards ===
- Ivor Novello Award for Best Song Musically and Lyrically for his poems used in the song "Memory" (1982)

=== Academic awards ===
- Inducted into Phi Beta Kappa (1935)
- Elected to the American Academy of Arts and Sciences (1954)
- Elected to the American Philosophical Society (1960)
- Thirteen honorary doctorates (including ones from Oxford, Cambridge, the Sorbonne, and Harvard)

=== Other honours ===
- Eliot College of the University of Kent, England, named in his honour
- Celebrated on U.S. commemorative postage stamps
- Star on the St. Louis Walk of Fame

== Works ==
Source: "The Nobel Prize in Literature 1948 | T.S. Eliot | Bibliography". nobelprize.org. Archived from the original on 7 November 2012.

=== Earliest works ===
- Prose
  - "The Birds of Prey" (short story; 1905)
  - "A Tale of a Whale" (short story; 1905)
  - "The Man Who Was King" (short story; 1905)
  - "The Wine and the Puritans" (review, 1909)
  - "The Point of View" (1909)
  - "Gentlemen and Seamen" (1909)
  - "Egoist" (review, 1909)
- Poems
  - "A Fable for Feasters" (1905)
  - "[A Lyric:] 'If Time and Space as Sages say'" (1905)
  - "[At Graduation 1905]" (1905)
  - "Song: 'If space and time, as sages say'" (1907)
  - "Before Morning" (1908)
  - "Circe's Palace" (1908)
  - "Song: 'When we came home across the hill'" (1909)
  - "On a Portrait" (1909)
  - "Song: 'The moonflower opens to the moth'" (1909)
  - "Nocturne" (1909)
  - "Humoresque" (1910)
  - "Spleen" (1910)
  - "[Class] Ode" (1910)
  - "The Death of Saint Narcissus" (c. 1911-15)

=== Poetry ===
- Prufrock and Other Observations (1917)
  - "The Love Song of J. Alfred Prufrock"
  - "Portrait of a Lady"
  - "Preludes"
  - "Rhapsody on a Windy Night"
  - "Morning at the Window"
  - "The Boston Evening Transcript" (about the Boston Evening Transcript)
  - "Aunt Helen"
  - "Cousin Nancy"
  - "Mr. Apollinax"
  - "Hysteria"
  - "Conversation Galante"
  - "La Figlia Che Piange"
- Poems (1920)
  - "Gerontion"
  - "Burbank with a Baedeker: Bleistein with a Cigar"
  - "Sweeney Erect"
  - "A Cooking Egg"
  - "Le Directeur"
  - "Mélange Adultère de Tout"
  - "Lune de Miel"
  - "The Hippopotamus"
  - "Dans le Restaurant"
  - "Whispers of Immortality"
  - "Mr. Eliot's Sunday Morning Service"
  - "Sweeney Among the Nightingales"
- The Waste Land (1922)
- The Hollow Men (1925)
- Ariel Poems (1927–1954)
  - "Journey of the Magi" (1927)
  - "A Song for Simeon" (1928)
  - "Animula" (1929)
  - "Marina" (1930)
  - "Triumphal March" (1931)
  - "The Cultivation of Christmas Trees" (1954)
- "Ash Wednesday" (1930)
- "Coriolan" (1931)
- Old Possum's Book of Practical Cats (1939)
  - "Macavity:The Mystery Cat"
- "The Marching Song of the Pollicle Dogs" and "Billy M'Caw: The Remarkable Parrot" (1939) in The Queen's Book of the Red Cross
- Four Quartets (1945)

=== Plays ===
- Sweeney Agonistes (published in 1926, first performed in 1934)
- The Rock (1934)
- Murder in the Cathedral (1935)
- The Family Reunion (1939)
- The Cocktail Party (1949)
- The Confidential Clerk (1953)
- The Elder Statesman (first performed in 1958, published in 1959)

=== Non-fiction ===
- Christianity & Culture (1939, 1948)
- "The Second-Order Mind" (1920)
- "Tradition and the Individual Talent" (1920)
- The Sacred Wood: Essays on Poetry and Criticism (1920)
  - "Hamlet and His Problems"
- Homage to John Dryden (1924)
- "Shakespeare and the Stoicism of Seneca" (1928)
- For Lancelot Andrewes (1928)
- Dante (1929)
- Selected Essays, 1917–1932 (1932)
- The Use of Poetry and the Use of Criticism (1933)
- After Strange Gods (1934)
- Elizabethan Essays (1934)
- Essays Ancient and Modern (1936)
- The Idea of a Christian Society (1939)
- A Choice of Kipling's Verse (1941) made by Eliot, with an essay on Rudyard Kipling
- Notes Towards the Definition of Culture (1948)
- "Poetry and Drama" (1951)
- "The Three Voices of Poetry" (1954)
- "The Frontiers of Criticism" (1956)
- On Poetry and Poets (1943)

=== Posthumous publications ===
- To Criticize the Critic (1965)
- Poems Written in Early Youth (1967)
- The Waste Land: Facsimile Edition (1974)
- Inventions of the March Hare: Poems 1909–1917 (1996)

=== Critical editions ===
- Collected Poems, 1909–1962 (1963), excerpt and text search
- Old Possum's Book of Practical Cats, Illustrated Edition (1982), excerpt and text search
- Selected Prose of T.S. Eliot, edited by Frank Kermode (1975), excerpt and text search
- The Waste Land (Norton Critical Editions), edited by Michael North (2000) excerpt and text search
- The Poems of T.S. Eliot, volume 1 (Collected & Uncollected Poems) and volume 2 (Practical Cats & Further Verses), edited by Christopher Ricks and Jim McCue (2015), Faber & Faber
- Selected Essays (1932); enlarged (1960)
- The Letters of T. S. Eliot, edited by Valerie Eliot and Hugh Haughton, Volume 1: 1898–1922 (1988, revised 2009)
- The Letters of T. S. Eliot, edited by Valerie Eliot and Hugh Haughton, Volume 2: 1923–1925 (2009)
- The Letters of T. S. Eliot, edited by Valerie Eliot and John Haffenden, Volume 3: 1926–1927 (2012)
- The Letters of T. S. Eliot, edited by Valerie Eliot and John Haffenden, Volume 4: 1928–1929 (2013)
- The Letters of T. S. Eliot, edited by Valerie Eliot and John Haffenden, Volume 5: 1930–1931 (2014)
- The Letters of T. S. Eliot, edited by Valerie Eliot and John Haffenden, Volume 6: 1932–1933 (2016)
- The Letters of T. S. Eliot, edited by Valerie Eliot and John Haffenden, Volume 7: 1934–1935 (2017)
- The Letters of T. S. Eliot, edited by Valerie Eliot and John Haffenden, Volume 8: 1936–1938 (2019)
- The Letters of T. S. Eliot, edited by Valerie Eliot and John Haffenden, Volume 9: 1939–1941 (2021)
- The Letters of T. S. Eliot, edited by Valerie Eliot and John Haffenden, Volume 10: 1942–1944 (2025)

== Depictions in other media ==
=== Novels ===
- The Eliot Quartet by Australian author Steven Carroll (2009–2022)
  - The quartet comprises: The Lost Life: A Novel (2009); A World of Other People (2013); A New England Affair (2017); and Goodnight, Vivienne, Goodnight (2022)

=== Drama ===
- Tom & Viv, a play by Michael Hastings (1984)

=== Cinema ===
- Tom & Viv directed by Brian Gilbert (1994) - an adaptation of the Michael Hastings play

== See also ==
- List of American Nobel laureates
