= Virginia Ferrar =

English bookbinder and sericulturist (1627–1688)

- Born: 24 December 1627
- Died: 14 January 1688 (aged 60); Little Gidding community
- Occupation: bookbinder
- Parent(s): John Ferrar and his wife

Virginia Ferrar (24 December 1627 – 14 January 1688) was an English bookbinder and sericulturist involved with the Little Gidding community in Cambridgeshire.

== Life ==
She was born on Christmas Eve 1627. Her father was John Ferrar and his second wife was Bathsheba Owen. She was named for the colony of Virginia as her father was the deputy governor. She was baptised on Christmas Day.

In the late 1640s, her father was the head of the household after her uncle Nicholas died. Her father could have run the Little Gidding community with his wife or son but he chose to rely on his niece, Mary, and Virginia.

She learned how to print with her cousins. When she was twelve years old she was (like her female relatives) helping in the book creation business in Little Gidding. One of her creations (with very substantial additions by her father) is extant and is titled "The Actions, Doctrine and Other Passages Touching Our Lord & Saviour Jesus Christ as They Are Related by the Four Evangelists". This was part of one of the many scrapbooks created by joining cut out prints. The Little Gidding community were known for creating harmonies which were books that aimed to create a unified gospel from the four in the bible. The community were creditted with almost finding a new form of printing as they would disguise the joins created by cutting out excerpts for elsewhere by applying heavy pressure to the resulting joins.

Virginia was involved when the community decided to sell 200 copies of Eikon Basilike, a book allegedly written by Charles I, in the Virginia colony. This idea was unsuccessful. Her father's other ideas included creating a silk worm farm at the community and he also arranged for Virginia to publish his letters under her own name. These were publications intended for colonists in Virginia.

Her father and several others of her relatives died of influenza in 1657. He made Virginia his executor and not Bathsheba, his wife, or his son. His bequests included property in Bermuda which he left to her.

Ferrar died in Little Gidding in 1688.
