= Little Gidding community =

Church of England religious group

The Little Gidding community was an extended family and religious group based at Little Gidding, Huntingdonshire (now in Cambridgeshire), England, in existence from the middle of the 1620s to the later 1650s. It gained attention in its time because of the interest Charles I of England showed in it. In the 19th century associated buildings were restored; T. S. Eliot was attracted to it as an examplar of religious life in the Church of England, and subsequently made it prominent by his poem Little Gidding, one of the Four Quartets.

== Foundation ==
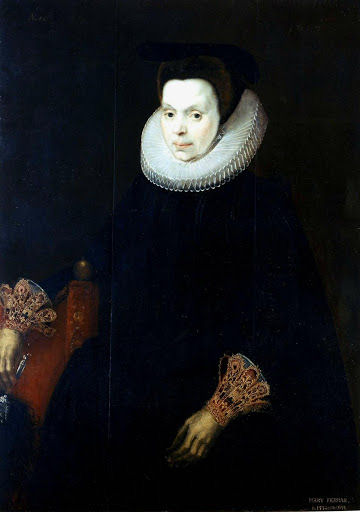
Mary Ferrar, 1617 portrait

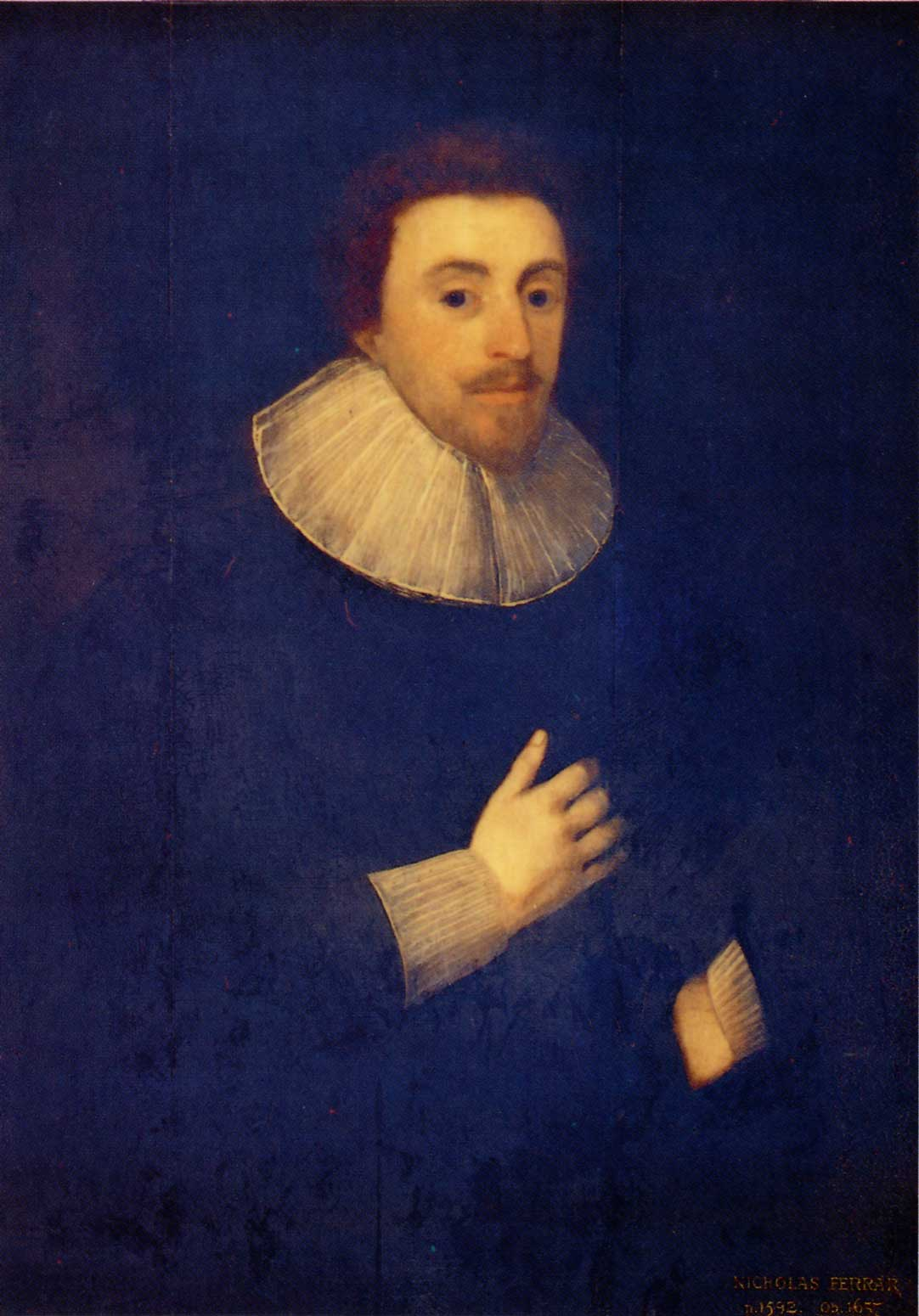
Nicholas Ferrar

Little Gidding near Sawtry was a small village when it was the site chosen by Nicholas Ferrar and his mother Mary Ferrar for a new Ferrar family home: they were then retreating from adverse events in the London and court circles. There was an existing church, in a poor state of maintenance, and a life of work and prayer was set up.

== Background ==
In 1620, Esmé Stewart, Earl of March sold the manor of Little Gidding to Thomas Sheppard. Population had declined in this rural area. Sheppard then sold the property to Nicholas Ferrar and his cousin Arthur Wodenoth in 1625 as trustees for Mary Ferrar (née Wodenoth). The Ferrars and Wodenoths were investors in the Virginia Company.

John Ferrar, elder brother to Nicholas, was a merchant partner of Thomas Sheppard, who by the early 1620s was heavily in debt. The legal position made John also liable for those debts. The purchase of Little Gidding from Sheppard was used by Nicholas to settle with the creditors, relying on Mary's money, and untangle John from the liability. In the aftermath of the 1622 collapse of the Virginia Company, and the loss of a large portion of their fortune, the Ferrar family moved to Little Gidding. An immediate reason to leave London was the second plague pandemic, and a 1625 outbreak there.

The rector of St John's Church, Little Gidding, from 1614 was Michael Reade, an Oxford graduate in 1608. He had other livings, in particular becoming rector of Cottisford in 1625. In 1626, Nicholas Ferrar was ordained as a deacon by William Laud, then Bishop of St David's, in Westminster Abbey. The parish of Little Gidding was in the diocese of Lincoln. Its bishop when the community was founded was John Williams. He was a supporter in church terms, and made three visits to Little Gidding.

== Family structure and place of women ==
The community as founded amounted to around 30 persons. Mary and Nicholas Ferrar were joined at the Little Gidding manor house by two siblings of Nicholas, John Ferrar, and Susanna who was married to John Collett (born 1571), with members of their families.

Mary Ferrar died in 1634, having handed over her matriarchal role in 1632 to Mary Collett. Nicholas, who was unmarried, died in 1637. The girls of the community were educated in Latin, as well as practical skills. Antonia Fraser links suspicion of women having Latin, the deficit in female education caused by the dissolution of the monasteries in the previous century, and the gibes aimed at the community about being a "Protestant nunnery".

== Book production ==
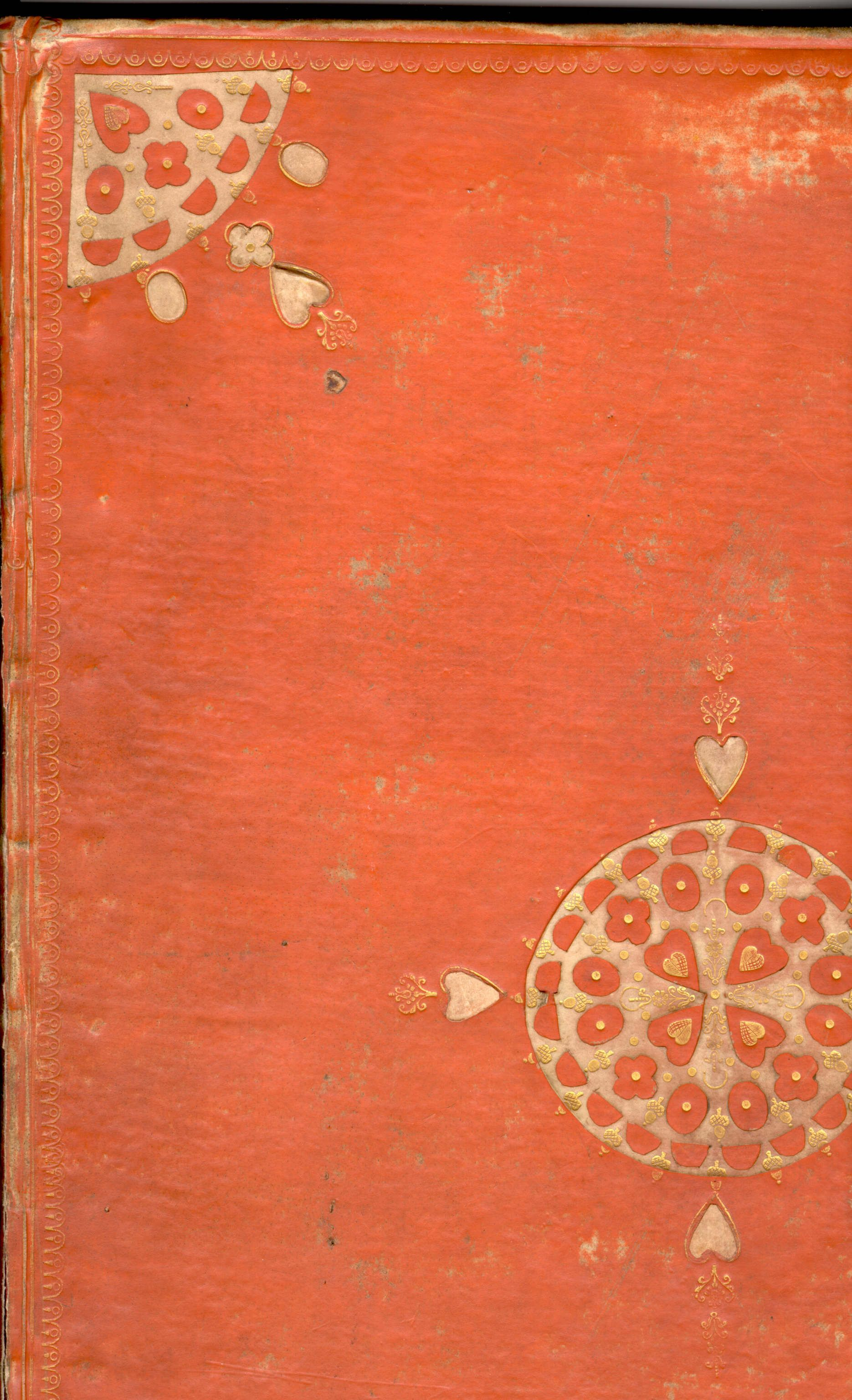
Binding of a Little Gidding harmony of the Four Evangelists

The community put a large effort into producing examples of a distinctive type of book, a one-off illustrated gospel harmony. Biblical text was enriched with larger assemblages made from cut-up Netherlandish prints. Among the engravers whose work was used for illustration was Boetius à Bolswert. A major source was prints of 16th century Dutch and Flemish artists with strong Italian influences: Marten van Heemskerck, Jan van der Straet, Marten de Vos.

Little Gidding was also renowned for its bookbinding. The bindings were of velvet or leather, and typically were stamped in gold with simple motifs.

== Cambridge connections ==
The University of Cambridge is about 30 miles (48 km) from Little Gidding. Nicholas Ferrar had been an undergraduate at Clare College, Cambridge, where he was taught by Augustine Lindsell, graduating B.A. in 1610. Lindsell attended his ordination as deacon in 1626.

Ferrar Collett, brother of Mary Collett, went to Peterhouse, matriculating in 1636, and studied under Richard Crashaw. Crashaw possibly knew Nicholas Ferrar in London; he certainly visited Little Gidding in the years after 1631, as a Cambridge student, and kept up his relationship with the community after Nicholas had died.

The poet George Herbert was public orator at Cambridge in the 1620s, and from 1626 had a prebendal residence at Leighton Bromswold, close to Little Gidding. He was in the orbit of Ferrar and the community, for the years until 1630 when he moved away to a living at Bemerton. The church at Leighton was in need of repair. The landowner there was Katherine, Duchess of Lennox, widow of Esmé Stewart (died 1624) who had owned Little Gidding. She financed some of the construction work required. John and Nicholas Farrar managed it.

After Herbert's death in 1633, his papers went to Nicholas Ferrar and his cousin Arthur Wodenoth. A folio manuscript of the poetry collection by Herbert, which became known as The Temple, was made at Little Gidding by Anna and Mary Collett (perhaps with help), in order to apply for permission to publish. Later owned by William Sancroft and Thomas Tanner, it is now MS Tanner 307 at the Bodleian Library.

== Visitors ==
Little Gidding was visited in 1634 by an outsider, the barrister Edward Lenton. He was able to observe liturgical details in the church that went against the idea that the community was Laudian. In fact Bishop John Williams did not enforce Laud's strictures on altars. Nonetheless, Lenton's account was used by the community's critics in an attack of 1641.

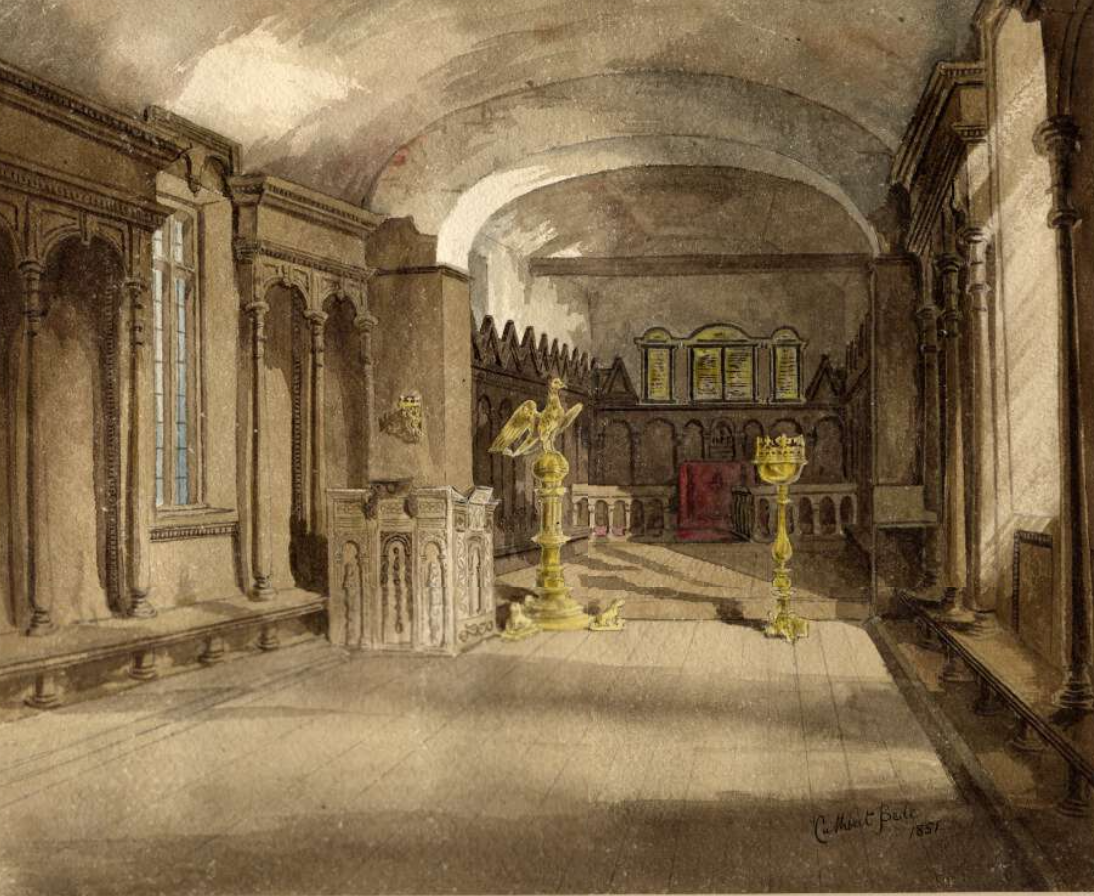
Little Gidding church, 1851 drawing of the 18th century interior, showing some original 17th century features such as the opposed wall seating rather than pews

On an occasion when Nicholas Ferrar was away, Charles I was in the district on a royal progress. He asked through a courtier to borrow one the community's books, about which he had heard. It led to a commission to produce a book for the king. He visited Little Gidding in 1633, on the way north to his coronation in Edinburgh.

Charles I stayed at Little Gidding early in March 1642, as he made his way north, just before the outbreak of the English Civil War. He had with him the Prince of Wales (later Charles II), and they examined the final book to be made at Little Gidding, a Pentateuch harmony, thought to be intended for the Prince. The king also went hunting, shooting a hare. An ample account was published in Peter Peckard's edition of John Ferrar's biography of his brother, including the king's parting words "Pray, pray for my speedy and safe return".

In the last days of the First English Civil War, Charles I arrived at Little Gidding unaccompanied, on 2 May 1646. John Ferrar found him a place of concealment at Coppingford. From there he reached the Scottish army at Newark, via Stamford, on 5 May.
