= A World of Other People =

2013 novel by Steven Carroll

- First edition
- Author: Steven Carroll
- Language: English
- Series: The Eliot Quartet
- Genre: novel
- Publisher: Fourth Estate, Australia
- Publication date: 2013
- Publication place: Australia
- Media type: Print (Paperback)
- Pages: 278
- ISBN: 9780732291204
- Preceded by: The Lost Life
- Followed by: A New England Affair

A World of Other People (2013) is a novel by Australian author Steven Carroll.

It is the second novel in the author's Eliot Quartet, following The Lost Life (2009) and is followed by A New England Affair (2017), and Goodnight, Vivienne, Goodnight (2022).

It was the joint winner of the 2014 Prime Minister's Literary Awards.

== Plot summary ==
The novel uses T. S. Eliot's poem "Little Gidding" from Four Quartets as a starting point. The time is 1941 and London is experiencing The Blitz. Iris, a young civil servant, has volunteered to be an aircraft spotter on a building in Russell Square. Another spotter is Eliot himself, as the building is the headquarters of the publishing house, Faber & Faber. Late one night the pair witness the crash of a British Wellington bomber, and Eliot goes on to write his poem utilising this incident. At the initial public reading of the poem, Jim, the pilot of the crashed aircraft, happens to be in the audience and recognises his accident being depicted in the poem.

== Notes ==
- Epigraph:

Our interest's on the dangerous edge of things.
The honest thief, the tender murderer,
The superstitious atheist...

– "Bishop Blougram's Apology", Robert Browning.

== Reviews ==
- Andrew Reimer in The Sydney Morning Herald noted that the book is a "highly accomplished novel...eloquent and assured."
- Andrew Fuhrmann in The Sydney Review of Books states: "So clear and careful is the prose in A World of Other People that it produces a kind of dreamy dollhouse effect, a toy theatre, a meticulously reconstructed model London with a T.S. Eliot doll at its centre, ventriloquially recognisable, albeit speaking in squeaks and stammers. There is also a sense of stillness, a sense of intimacy: a kind of prosaic equivalent to the Quartets and their air of a closed or self-contained world.

== Awards and nominations ==
- 2014 shortlisted Adelaide Festival Awards for Literature
- 2014 joint winner Prime Minister's Literary Awards — Fiction With Richard Flanagan's The Narrow Road to the Deep North
