= Arthur Wodenoth =

English goldsmith and colonial pioneer

Arthur Wodenoth or Woodnoth (c.1594–1645) was an English goldsmith and colonial pioneer, a member of the Virginia Company and Somers Islands Company.

== Life ==
He was born about 1594, the son of John Wodenoth of Shavington and his wife Jane Touchet, and nephew of Mary Ferrar née Wodenoth. He became a goldsmith in Foster Lane, London.

At one time Arthur thought of taking holy orders, but was dissuaded by his cousin Nicholas Ferrar. It was he who arranged the 1625 purchase of Little Gidding by Mary Ferrar, and he supervised the restoration of the neighbouring church at Leighton Bromswold, to which Ferrar's friend George Herbert had been presented in 1626. He was a correspondent of Ferrar's sister Susanna Collett, and a close friend of Herbert. He witnessed Mrs Ferrar's will in 1628, was present at Herbert's death in 1633, and was executor of his will. He was also well known to Izaak Walton, whom he supplied with details of Herbert's life.

It was probably through Sir John Danvers that Wodenoth became interested in the Virginia Company. He was not a member till some time after 1612, but he took an active part in the affairs of the company till the revocation of its charter, siding, like Ferrar, with the party of Sir Edwin Sandys against that of Sir Thomas Smith. In 1644 he was deputy governor of the Somers Islands Company, and before his death he drew up a Short Collection of the most Remarkable Passages from the Originall to the Dissolution of the Virginia Company, London, 1651; it is in the main a defence of Sandys, Ferrar, and Danvers. Wodenoth was dead before the publication, and in the preface is said to have been a parliamentarian.

== Family ==
He was descended from the Wodenoths or Woodnoths of Shavington, Cheshire. He was second son of John Wodenoth of Shavington, by his second wife, Jane, daughter of John Touchet of Whitley. Mary Wodenoth, the mother of Nicholas Ferrar, was his father's sister; and his father's brother Thomas, who settled at Linkinhorne, Cornwall, and spelled the name Wodenote, was father of Theophilus Wodenote.

He was married, and had a son Ralph.
