= The Lost Life (novel) =

2009 novel by Steven Carroll

- Author: Steven Carroll
- Language: English
- Series: The Eliot Quartet
- Genre: novel
- Publisher: Fourth Estate, Australia
- Publication date: 1 April 2009
- Publication place: Australia
- Media type: Print (Paperback)
- Pages: 244
- ISBN: 9780732284800
- Preceded by: -
- Followed by: A World of Other People

The Lost Life (2009) is a novel by Australian author Steven Carroll.

It is the first novel in the author's Eliot Quartet, and was followed by A World of Other People (2013), A New England Affair (2017) and Goodnight, Vivienne, Goodnight (2022).

== Plot summary ==
In England, September 1934, 22-year-old Daniel and 18-year-old Catherine are picnicking in the grounds of Burnt Norton, when they observe the poet T. S. Eliot walking with his companion Emily Hale. Elliot and Hale, thinking themselves alone, appear to plight themselves to one another, and then to bury a small tin in the garden. But mischievous Daniel interferes.

== Critical reception ==
Reviewing the novel for The Age newspaper James Ley noted that in the novel "Eliot remains an elusive figure, the only one of the four principal characters whose consciousness the novel does not presume to inhabit. The iconic poet embodies the idea that to observe an event is to shape its meaning and conveys a lingering sense that the truth of what occurs within an intimate relationship between two people remains unknowable to outsiders. All we see are fragments, the symbols of a lost life: a ring, a flower and a note, sealed in a tobacco tin and buried in the earth."

In Australian Book Review Patrick Allington found there "is a melancholic power to The Lost Life, but also enough sparkle and wit to stop the whole thing from becoming maudlin. But while Carroll writes with characteristic restraint, just occasionally there is a slight thinness or imbalance."

== Awards and nominations ==
- 2010 ALS Gold Medal, shortlisted
- 2010 Barbara Jefferis Award, shortlisted

== Notes ==
- The author spoke to Jane Sullivan, from The Sydney Morning Herald, about the novel and its development
