= Steven Carroll =

Australian writer

- Born: 1949 (age 76–77); Melbourne, Victoria, Australia
- Occupation: writer
- Writing career
- Language: English
- Period: 1984-
- Notable work: A World of Other People
- Notable awards: Prime Minister's Literary Award, Miles Franklin Award

Steven Carroll (born 1949) is an Australian novelist. He was born in Melbourne, Victoria and studied at La Trobe University. He has taught English at secondary school level, and drama at RMIT. He has been Drama Critic for The Sunday Age newspaper in Melbourne.

His 2001 novel The Art of the Engine Driver was inspired by a dream taking him back to his childhood in Glenroy in the fifties.

Steven Carroll is now a full-time writer living in Melbourne with his partner, the writer Fiona Capp, and their son. As of 2019, he also writes the non-fiction book review column for the Sydney Morning Herald.

== Awards and nominations ==
- 2002: Miles Franklin Award, Shortlisted, The Art of the Engine Driver
- 2005: Miles Franklin Award, Shortlisted, The Gift of Speed
- 2005: Prix Femina (France), Shortlisted for Best Foreign Novel, The Art of the Engine Driver
- 2008: Miles Franklin Award, Winner, The Time We Have Taken
- 2008: Commonwealth Writers' Prize for the SE Asia and Pacific Region, Winner, The Time We Have Taken
- 2013: Prime Minister's Literary Award, Joint Winner for Fiction, A World of Other People
- 2015: Victorian Premier's Literary Award, Shortlisted, Forever Young
- 2016: Prime Minister's Literary Award, Shortlisted for Fiction, Forever Young
- 2018: Victorian Premier's Literary Award, Shortlisted, A New England Affair
- 2025: International Dublin Literary Award, Longlisted, Death of a Foreign Gentleman

== Bibliography ==
=== Novels ===
- Remember Me, Jimmy James (1992)
- Momoko (1994)
- The Love Song of Lucy McBride (1998)
- The Lovers' Room (2007) [revised version of Momoko]
- Twilight in Venice (2008) [this is a substantially re-written and abridged version of The Love Song of Lucy McBride], also published as The Last Venetian
- O (2021)
- Death Of A Foreign Gentleman (2024)

==== Glenroy series ====
- The Art of the Engine Driver (2001)
- The Gift of Speed (2004)
- The Time We Have Taken (2007)
- Spirit of Progress (2011)
- Forever Young (2015)
- The Year of the Beast (2019)

==== The Eliot quartet ====
- The Lost Life (2009)
- A World of Other People (2013)
- A New England Affair (2017)
- Goodnight, Vivienne, Goodnight (2022)

=== Critical studies and reviews ===
- Dooley, Gillian (November 2008). "Review of "The Time We Have Taken"" (PDF). Transnational Literature. 1 (1).
- Allington, Patrick (September 2011). "Everyday profundity". Australian Book Review (334): 25–26. Review of Spirit of Progress.
- Anderson, Don (April 2013). "Dove descending". Australian Book Review. 350: 20. Review of A world of other people.

== Interviews ==
- "AdelaideNow... Present tense with meaning". The Advertiser. 10 March 2007. Archived from the original on 16 June 2008.
- Transcript of interview from the radio program "The Book Show", 20 June 2008
- Podcast of interview with Louise Swinn, 20 July 2008
- "Open Page with Steven Carroll". Australian Book Review (334): 68. September 2011.
- Gillian Dooley, "Reinventing Lives: A Conversation with Steven Carroll" in "Writers in Conversation", February 2019
