= Goodnight, Vivienne, Goodnight =

2022 novel by Steven Carroll

- Author: Steven Carroll
- Language: English
- Series: The Eliot Quartet
- Genre: novel
- Publisher: Fourth Estate, Australia
- Publication date: 2 March 2022
- Publication place: Australia
- Media type: Print (Paperback)
- Pages: 256
- ISBN: 9781460751114
- Preceded by: A New England Affair
- Followed by: -

Goodnight, Vivienne, Goodnight (2022) is a novel by Australian author Steven Carroll.

It is the fourth novel in the author's Eliot Quartet, following The Lost Life (2009) and A World of Other People (2013), and A New England Affair (2017).

== Plot summary ==
Vivienne Eliot, T. S. Eliot's first wife, was committed to a mental hospital five years after their marriage's breakdown. With the help of friends Vivienne escapes from the hospital and detective sergeant Stephen Minter is given the task of tracking her down and returning her to the hospital.

== Critical reception ==
In Australian Book Review Patrick Allington noted that "Eliot – sometimes Tom, sometimes T.S. – intrudes upon the novel as if he were the humid air that Viv and readers must inhale. And although Eliot and various other characters line up to judge Viv's well-being, her past behaviour, her role in a failed marriage, Carroll works hard to emphasise Viv's perspective, her clarity, her calmness." And he concluded that the novels of "the Eliot quartet have a searching and delicate, almost frail, beauty. And the four individual novels come together to make a tense, echo-laden whole."

A review in The Sydney Morning Herald noted that "Great writers are apt to become monuments after their death. Carroll has little time for literary monuments; his interest, particularly in Goodnight and in its predecessor, A New England Affair, is more with the women in Eliot’s life than with Eliot himself."

== Awards and nominations ==
- 2023 longlisted Voss Literary Prize
- 2022 longlisted ARA Historical Novel Prize — Adult
