= A New England Affair =

2017 novel by Steven Carroll

- Author: Steven Carroll
- Language: English
- Series: The Eliot Quartet
- Genre: novel
- Publisher: HarperCollins, Australia
- Publication date: 21 August 2017
- Publication place: Australia
- Media type: Print (Paperback)
- Pages: 256
- ISBN: 9781460751091
- Preceded by: A World of Other People
- Followed by: Goodnight, Vivienne, Goodnight

A New England Affair (2017) is a novel by Australian author Steven Carroll.

It is the third novel in the author's Eliot Quartet, following The Lost Life (2009) and A World of Other People (2013), and is followed by Goodnight, Vivienne, Goodnight (2022).

== Plot summary ==
The year is 1965 and poet T. S. Eliot has died in London. In New England, USA, 74-year-old Emily Hale reflects on her life, especially the unconsummated "affair" she had with poet T. S. Eliot, and the night in 1913 when the two fell madly in love with each other.

== Critical reception ==
Reviewing the novel for The Sydney Morning Herald Dennis Haskell noted the influence of author Henry James in Carroll's work, "because Carroll's novels do not present dramatic events; rather, characters think over and over what outwardly seem small events in their lives. Carroll knows, as James and Eliot did, that the most significant aspect of anyone's life is the inner life." Haskell concluded that "there is a lot of Mr Eliot and Mr James in Mr Carroll – by which I mean very high praise indeed."

In Australian Book Review Patrick Allington wrote that at "times, the portrait of Emily and Tom's complex bond is tender, their version of love authentic precisely because of its awkwardness. But at other times it is excruciating to watch them circle each other, each playing a predetermined role. Whenever Emily loses patience – whether with Tom or with the gendered and mannered world that she inhabits – it’s hard to do anything other than cheer."

== Awards and nominations ==
- 2018 shortlisted Victorian Premier's Prize for Fiction

== Notes ==
The novel makes particular use of Eliot's poem "The Dry Salvages", the title of which comes from a marine rock formation off the coast of Cape Ann, Massachusetts, where Eliot spent time at as a child.
