= Mary Ferrar =

English religious and community leader (1551-1634)

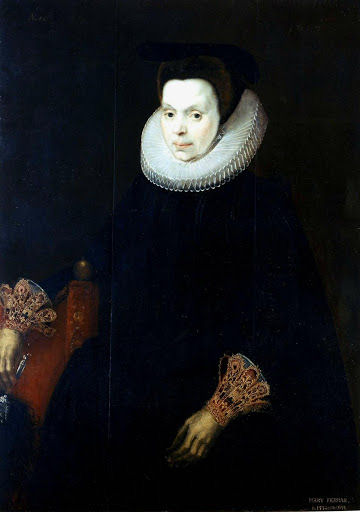
Portrait of Mary Ferrar by Cornelius Janssen (1617) at Magdalene College, Cambridge

Mary Ferrar (1551 – 1634) was the matriarch of the Ferrar family who, with her son Nicholas Ferrar, founded the Little Gidding religious community in Huntingdonshire in 1625.

== Early life and family ==
Ferrar was born in 1551 as Mary Wodenoth (or Woodnoth), daughter of Lawrence Wodenoth of Shavington Hall, Cheshire, and grew up on the family estate. Described as a "woman of fervent piety and a model mother", in 1581 at St Gabriel Fenchurch in London she married Nicholas Ferrar the Elder (1546-1620), a merchant of London, Master of the Skinners' Company and an investor in the Virginia Company who traded extensively with the East and West Indies. He was interested in the adventures of Hawkins, Drake and Raleigh. With him she had six children:

- Susanna Ferrar (1583-1657), who married John Collett of Bourn Bridge, Cambridgeshire
- Erasmus Ferrar (1586-1613), a barrister-of-law
- John Ferrar (1588–1657), a London merchant and Deputy Governor and Treasurer of the Virginia Company of London (Note: This John Ferrar is not to be confused with John Ferrar the Elder of Croxton and London, Esquire, father of Councillor William Farrar)
- Nicholas Ferrar (1592-1637), a scholar, courtier, businessman and ordained deacon in the Church of England
- William Ferrar (1594-1637)
- Richard Farrar (1596-1637), a wastrel who, to spite his father, changed the spelling of his name to Farrar and took no part in the family's interests in Virginia, according to biographers of Nicholas Ferrar

== Little Gidding ==
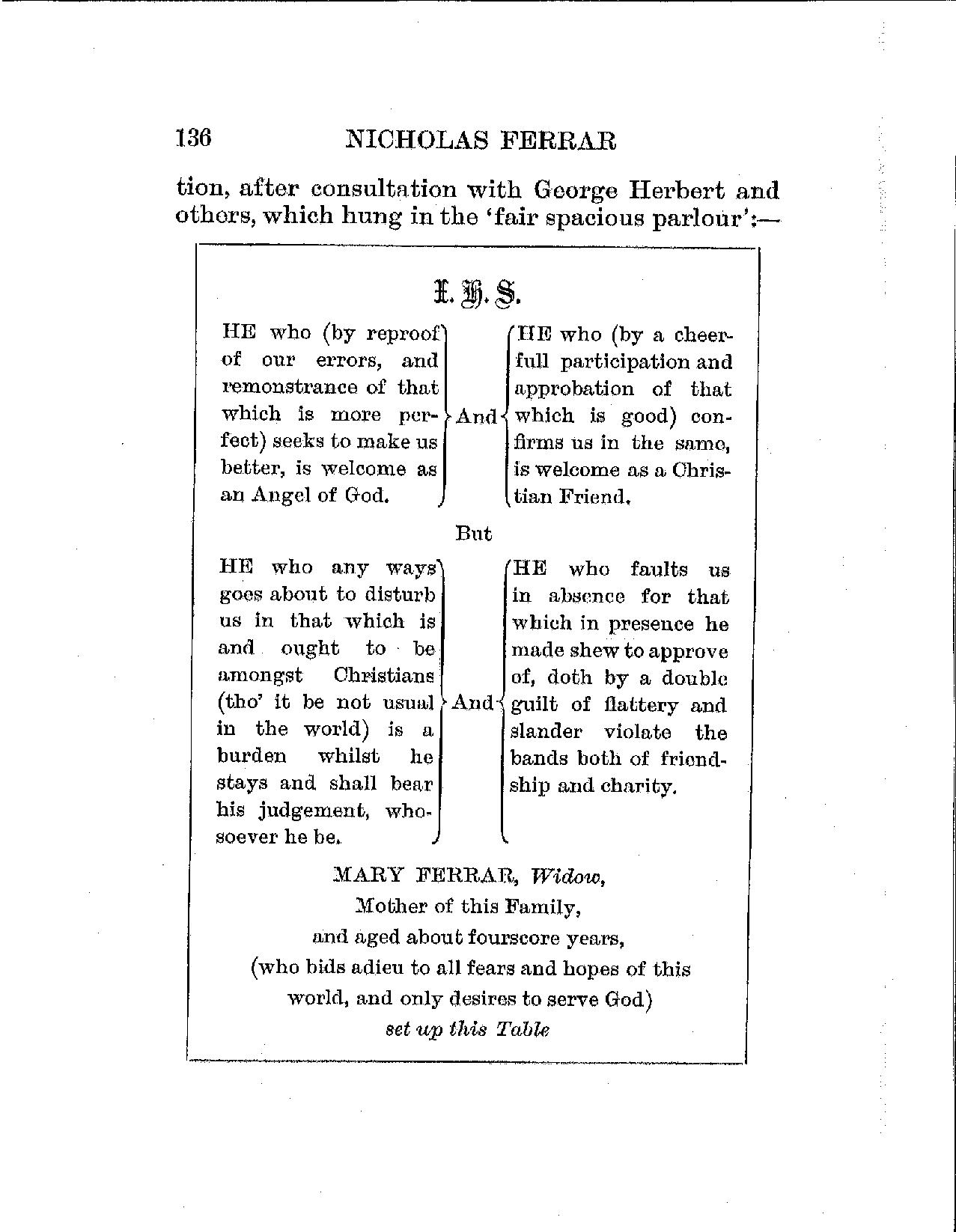
Mary Ferrar had a tablet placed in the family's parlour. Sir Thomas Hetley requested a copy, so, although the original has long been lost, the wording and the arrangement of the original text was preserved. Here it is as published in The Life and Times of Nicholas Ferrar by H. P. K. Skipton.

In 1620 Esmé Stewart, the Earl of March (1579–1624) and Lord Lieutenant of Huntingdonshire (later, briefly, the 3rd Duke of Lennox), sold the manor of Little Gidding to Thomas Sheppard. The Ferrars and Wodenoths were investors in the Virginia Company and other colonial projects. When the Virginia Company collapsed in 1624, taking with it a large portion of their fortune, John Ferrar faced financial ruin and Mary Ferrar realised that a home needed to be found for her family. She looked at Little Gidding and, the population having declined in this rural area, Sheppard sold the practically derelict property to Mary's son Nicholas Ferrar and her nephew Arthur Wodenoth (c. 1590 – c. 1650) in 1625 as trustees for Mary Ferrar, using her dower to purchase the property on her behalf. Here, after considerable renovation, the Ferrar family retreated to take on a humble, spiritual life of prayer, eschewing material, worldly life.

In 1625 during a period of plague in London, Mary Ferrar took refuge with her daughter Susanna Collet near Bourn in Cambridgeshire. The following year Mary moved into Little Gidding after it had been made somewhat more habitable, and she persuaded her daughter and her family to join her. The popular wisdom of the time was that it took a man and a woman to successfully run a household in the persons of a husband and wife. While it was not unusual for women to be the head of a family or to own property in the 17th century, the situation at Little Gidding was rather more unconventional as not only did the widowed Mary Ferrar share responsibility for the community with her unmarried son, but two other adult males (and their families) also submitted to her authority in the persons of her son John Ferrar and son-in-law John Collet.

Between 1625 and 1629 Nicholas Ferrar spent much of his time in London, and in 1626 he was ordained as a Deacon by William Laud (1573 – 1645), then Bishop of St David's and later Archbishop of Canterbury.

Soon the small community was joined by Mary's son John Ferrar and his family. Mary and her son Nicholas worked closely together to ensure the smooth running of their community, and during his absence in London Nicholas Ferrar wrote frequent letters to ensure that his strong-willed mother's wishes were heeded and acted upon as the owner of the property. She, for her part, valued his wisdom and vision, and through her affection for him she often deferred to his opinion. The extended Ferrar family numbering about forty people transformed their holdings at Little Gidding into a humble Anglican religious community. When they purchased it, the property consisted of a decayed manor house and the village's medieval parish church of St John which had not been worshipped in for sixty years. The Ferrars began repairing the site with Mary's first priority being the church, which had been desecrated through use as a barn and which was so full of hay that at first she was unable to enter to pray. By 1629 it was fully restored.

During this period Mary Ferrar commenced a series of charitable works among the local community. She endowed an almshouse in the form of a large room in her house for four elderly local widows who were regarded as part of the household and joined the daily prayers. A school was founded for children of the family and the children of friends, but it excluded local children. A dispensary was set up in the house to provide broth and medicines to local residents.

The community was never a formal religious community, as with a monastery or convent. They did not have an official Rule (such as the Rule of Saint Benedict), no vows were required, and no enclosure. The Ferrar household lived a Christian life according to High Church principles and the Book of Common Prayer. They engaged in tending to the health and education of local children and became skilled in bookbinding.

The Ferrar household was criticised by Puritans and denounced as a "Protestant Nunnery" and as Arminian heresy; in 1641 it was attacked in a pamphlet entitled "The Arminian Nunnery". The fame of the Ferrars and the Little Gidding community spread and they attracted visitors. King Charles I visited Little Gidding three times, including on 2 May 1646 seeking refuge after the Royalist defeat at the Battle of Naseby, when he was given temporary refuge by John Ferrar.

== Death and legacy ==
According to the biography of Nicholas Ferrar, in 1631 Mary Ferrar was "a tall, straight, deep complexioned, grave matron, of eighty years of age".

Upon her death in 1634, Mary Ferrar bequeathed Little Gidding to her son Nicholas Ferrar. She was buried at St John's Church, Little Gidding. Nicholas Ferrar died in December 1637, but the community continued under the leadership of his brother, John Ferrar, until 1657, when he and his sister Susanna Collet died within a month of each other.

After Mary Ferrar's death, John Farrer described his mother as "the head in the Body and the Bond and Simont [cement] to hould the whole Body of our Family United not only in Cohabitation but in Hartes". Years later he wrote to his son of "Your Pious Grandmother and devoute Vnkell [as] the Founders of our Family and p[re]sent State We possess in Gidding". A family friend wrote to Mary Ferrar's nephew Arthur Wodenoth that he recalled Mary Ferrar as "one who brought a new Religion into the world."
