= St John's Church, Little Gidding =

St John
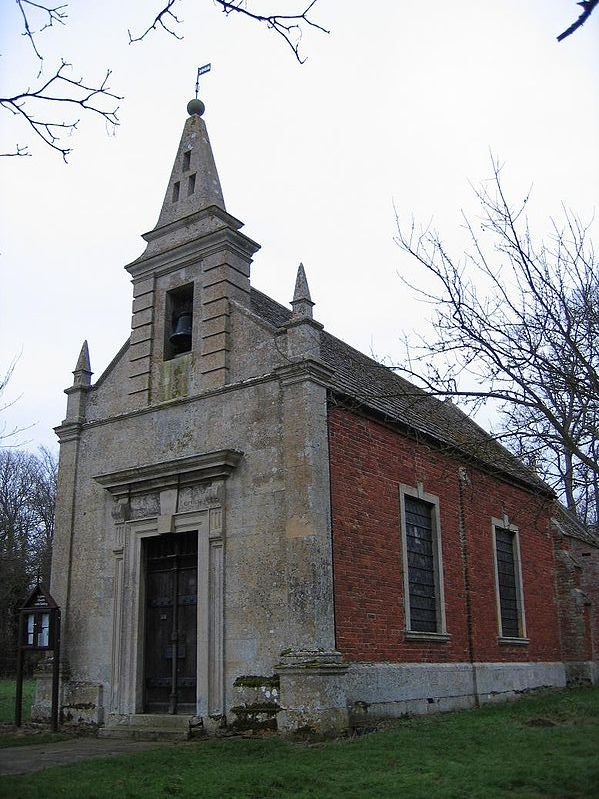
- The Church of Saint John the Evangelist, erected in 1714 to replace an earlier church at the site

- Location in Cambridgeshire
- 52.4211°N 0.3441°W
- Location: Little Gidding
- Country: England
- Denomination: Church of England
- Website: www.littlegiddingchurch.org.uk

Architecture
- Heritage designation: Grade I Listed
- Designated: 28 January 1958
- Completed: 1714

Specifications
- Capacity: 30
- Length: 32.75 feet (9.98 m)

Administration
- Province: Province of Canterbury
- Diocese: Diocese of Ely
- Archdeaconry: Archdeaconry of Huntingdon and Wisbech
- Deanery: Huntingdon Deanery
- Parish: Great with Little Steeple Gidding

Clergy
- Vicar: Mary Patricia Jepp

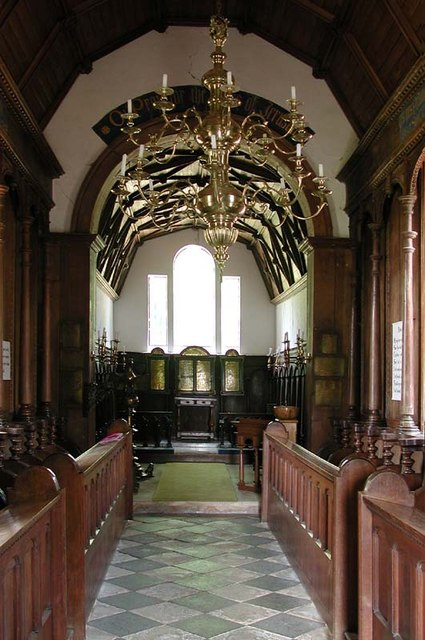
St John the Evangelist Church, East end

St John's Church is the Church of England parish church of the village of Little Gidding in Cambridgeshire. It is dedicated to St John the Evangelist and is a Grade I listed building. It is brick with a Ketton stone (a form of limestone) facing and a Collyweston stone slate roof.

== History ==
The earliest known building on the site was a medieval one with associations to the Knights Templar which was decaying by the 17th century but restored by Nicholas Ferrar and his family when they founded their religious community in the village at that date. Mary Ferrar had the church panelled with oak wainscoting, some of which survives on the south side of the present church's chancel. They installed an organ in March 1631–32 (now lost). Mistress Ferrar also donated the surviving brass font of c.1625 and the 15th-century brass lectern with eagle, while the current cedar communion table also dates from the Ferrars' occupancy.

That church was replaced by the present one in 1714 with a nave 8 feet shorter than its predecessor and removing the west gallery the Ferrars had installed. It was in its turn restored and altered in 1853.

The nave is 13.66 feet (4.16 m) wide and 32.75 feet (9.98 m) in length and fewer than 30 people can be accommodated in the stalls lining the wall of the nave. The chancel is 12 feet (3.7 m) wide and 22.75 feet (6.93 m) in width. On the south side of the chancel is a late 19th-century vestry which is a little larger than one half the width of the chancel.

Although photographs taken during the 1900s show an organ within the church, a 1999 survey for the National Pipe Organ Register stated that as of 1999, there was no pipe organ in this church.

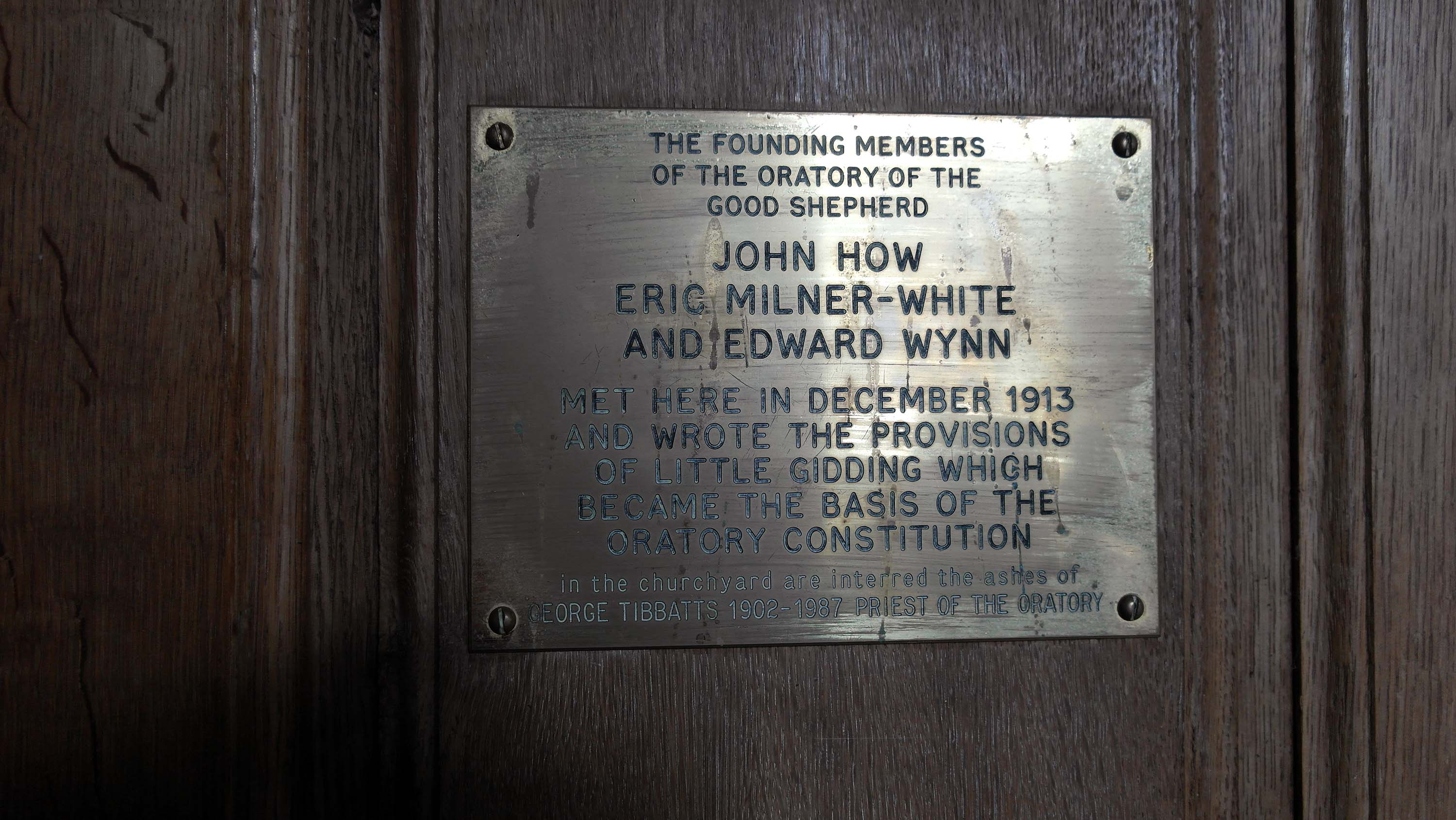
Plaque commemorating the founding of the Oratory of the Good Shepherd in Little Gidding

An Order in Council published in the London Gazette on 13 March 1923, combined the United Benefice of Great Gidding with Little Gidding with the Benefice of Steeple Gidding.

St John's is listed in Simon Jenkins' England's Thousand Best Churches.

== See also ==
- Anglican religious order
- George Herbert
- Leighton Bromswold
- Little Gidding (poem)
- Saints in Anglicanism

== Videos ==
- Little Gidding–St John's Church October 2013
- A Visit to Little Gidding
- Extracts from 'Little Gidding' - the poem by T S Eliot - read in Little Gidding
