= The Time We Have Taken =

2007 novel by Steven Carroll

- First edition
- Author: Steven Carroll
- Language: English
- Publisher: Fourth Estate, Australia
- Publication date: 2007
- Publication place: Australia
- Media type: Print (Paperback)
- Pages: 327 pp
- ISBN: 0-7322-7836-8
- OCLC: 225253907

The Time We Have Taken is a 2007 novel by Australian author Steven Carroll.

It is the third in the Glenroy Series sequence of novels, following The Art of the Engine Driver and The Gift of Speed, which follow the development of an outer Melbourne suburb from the 1950s to the 1970s. This entry oi the series was followed by Spirit of Progress (2011), Forever Young (2015), and The Year of the Beast (2019).

The novels have been described as a 'slow-moving, Proustian meditation on being and time' and 'a deeply satisfying encounter with the empty spaces that the suburb failed to fill both between people and inside them.'

== Awards ==
- Commonwealth Writers Prize, South East Asia and South Pacific Region, Best Book, 2008: winner
- Miles Franklin Literary Award, 2008: winner
- Victorian Premier's Literary Award, The Vance Palmer Prize for Fiction, 2007: shortlisted
- The Age Book of the Year Award, Fiction Prize, 2007: shortlisted

== Reviews ==
In The Age reviewer Michael McGirr noted that this series of novels "has the emotional stamina needed to draw life from the same characters over three independent novels". He concludes that the author "takes time to tell an untidy story with a gentle sense of wonder. His prose whispers loud."

Katharine England, writing in The Advertiser found that the "repetitive accretion of detail, like the brush strokes of a pointillist, the echoes within the novel and from book to book, the use of tenses which base time in the present but refer constantly to past and future, contribute to the hypnotic effect of the whole."
