= The Gift of Speed =

Book by Steven Carroll

- First edition
- Author: Steven Carroll
- Language: English
- Publisher: Fourth Estate, Australia
- Publication date: 2004
- Publication place: Australia
- Media type: Print (Paperback)
- Pages: 353 pp
- ISBN: 0-7322-7832-5
- OCLC: 56563640
- Dewey Decimal: 823/.914 22
- LC Class: PR9619.3.C382 G54 2004
- Preceded by: The Art of the Engine Driver
- Followed by: The Time We Have Taken

The Gift of Speed is a 2004 novel by Australian author Steven Carroll. It is the second in a sequence of novels, following The Art of the Engine Driver and followed by The Time We Have Taken.

== Awards ==
- Miles Franklin Literary Award, 2005: shortlisted

== Reviews ==
- "The Gift of Speed". The Age. August 21, 2004.
- Readings
