= Henry William Pullen =

Henry William Pullen (1836–1903) was an English cleric and writer. He is noted for his pamphlet The Fight at Dame Europa's School on the Franco-Prussian War.

== Life ==
Born at Little Gidding, then in Huntingdonshire, on 29 February 1836, he was the elder son of the four children of William Pullen, rector there, and his wife Amelia, daughter of Henry Wright. From February 1845 to Christmas 1848 he was at Marlborough College under its first headmaster Matthew Wilkinson. In 1848 his father, in poor health, moved with the family to Babbacombe, Devon.

Pullen matriculated at Clare College, Cambridge in 1855, where he graduated B.A. in 1859, proceeding M.A. in 1862. In 1859 he was ordained deacon on appointment to an assistant-mastership at Bradfield College, and became priest next year. He was elected vicar-choral of York Minster in 1862, and was transferred in 1863 to a similar post at Salisbury Cathedral. He passed the next 12 years of his life there, the period in which he did most of his writing.

In 1875 Pullen retired from Salisbury. During 1875–6 he served in Sir George Nares's British Arctic Expedition as chaplain on HMS Alert, receiving on his return the Arctic medal. Mount Pullen, on northern Ellesmere Island, would be named for him. For 12 years he travelled widely in Europe, based at Perugia his headquarters. The publisher John Murray appointed him editor of Murray's Handbooks for Travellers, and he revised the series.

Back in England in 1898, Pullen held successively the curacy of Rockbeare, Devon (1898–9) and several locum-tenancies. In May 1903 he became rector of Thorpe Mandeville, Northamptonshire, where was a brass tablet to his memory on the chancel wall. He died unmarried in a Birmingham nursing-home seven months later, on 15 December 1903; and was buried at Birdingbury, Warwickshire.

== Works ==
Near the end of 1870, a month into the Siege of Paris (1870–71), Pullen found fame with a pamphlet The Fight at Dame Europa's School. A parable on the European situation, it made John, the head of the school, who refuses to separate Louis and William in a fight, though he sees that Louis is beaten and that the prolongation of the fight is mere cruelty. John is reproached by Dame Europa for cowardice, is told that he has grown "a sloven and a screw", and is threatened with loss of his position. It was a runaway success, and earned Pullen £3000. A dramatised version by George T. Ferneyhough was acted on 17 March 1871 by amateurs at Derby. in aid of a fund for French sufferers. There were many replies, among them the anonymous John Justified, by Charles William Grant. In 1872 Pullen again attacked on Gladstone's administration in The Radical Member. A later pamphlet was Dr. Bull's Academy (1886). He did not repeat his success.

Several pamphlets (1869–72) on reform of cathedral organisation and clerical unbelief were combative, and Pullen was active in controversy until nearly the end of his life. In stories of school life, Tom Pippin's Wedding (1871), The Ground Ash (1874), and Pueris Reverentia (1892), he tackled issues in the English educational system. Other works were:

- Our Choral Services, 1865.
- The Psalms and Canticles Pointed for Chanting, 1867.
- The House that Baby built, 1874.
- Clerical Errors, 1874.
- A Handbook of Ancient Roman Marbles, 1894.
- Venus and Cupid, 1896.

Many of his books were at his own expense and loss-making. In 1848 his father had published a volume of verse by Pullen, called Affection's Offering..
