= Saints in Anglicanism =

Saints In Anglican Christianity

Saints in Anglicanism are people recognised as having lived a holy life and as being an exemplar and model for other Christians (as opposed to the Protestant teaching that saint is simply another term for a believer in Christ, literally "consecrated ones", from the Greek hagios). Beginning in the 10th century, the Catholic Church began to centralise and formalise the process of recognising saints through canonisation.

Saints who had been canonised when the Church of England was in communion with Rome generally continued to be recognised as saints after the English Reformation in the 16th century.

Since the split with Rome, the Church of England sometimes uses the word hero or heroine to recognise those holy people whom the church synod or an individual church praises as having had special benevolence. It considers such muted terms a reversion to a more simple and cautious doctrine which emphasises empowerment (subsidiarity) to all members and components of the church.

The provinces of the Anglican Communion therefore commemorate many of the saints in the General Roman Calendar, often on the same days.

In some cases, Anglican Calendars have kept pre-1954 celebratory days that the Roman Catholic Church has since moved or abolished in the General Roman Calendar of 1969.

== Early Christianity ==
Like the Roman Catholic Church, the Anglican Communion has special holy days in honour of Jesus Christ, the Blessed Virgin Mary and the Apostles. Many parish churches in the Communion have the names Christ Church, and St. Mary the Virgin. The same can also be said for the four great patrons of Great Britain and Ireland, Saint George (England), Saint David (Wales), Saint Patrick (Ireland), and Saint Andrew (Scotland).

== English saints ==
English and local saints are often emphasised, and there are differences between the provinces' calendars. King Charles I of England is the only person to have been treated as a new saint by some Anglicans following the English Reformation, after which he was referred to as a martyr and included briefly in a calendar of the Book of Common Prayer. This canonisation is, however, considered neither universal nor official in the Anglican Communion worldwide, and many national Churches list him as a martyr and not a Saint, or as neither.

== English martyrs ==
There are several persons commemorated in the modern Anglican calendars who were opposed to the Roman Catholic Church. Of particular note are John Wycliffe and William Tyndale, for beginning the full translation of the Bible into English (a project which led to the Geneva Bible), and for writings against the Catholic Church.

The Oxford Martyrs, Thomas Cranmer, Nicholas Ridley, and Hugh Latimer, are also commemorated for the courage they showed in death, and for their belief in a free Church of England.

== Ugandan martyrs ==
In the 19th century, 23 Anglican and 22 Roman Catholic converts were martyred together in Uganda. The Church of England commemorates the Ugandan martyrs on 3 June together with Archbishop Janani Luwum, who was murdered in 1977 on the orders of Idi Amin. On 18 October 1964, Pope Paul VI canonised the 22 Catholic Ugandan martyrs.

== Modern notables ==
Anglican churches also commemorate famous (often post-Reformation) Christians from various denominations. The West front of Westminster Abbey, for example, contains statues of 20th-century martyrs like Maximilian Kolbe, Martin Luther King Jr., Óscar Romero, Dietrich Bonhoeffer and Lucian Tapiedi (one of the Martyrs of New Guinea).

== Some traditional Anglican saints ==
- Aelred of Hexham (1110–1167), Abbot of Rievaulx—12 January
- Aidan (d. 651), Bishop of Lindisfarne—31 August
- Alban (d. between 209 and 304), protomartyr of Britain—22 June
- Alcuin of York (c. 735–804), Deacon, Abbot of Tours—20 May
- Aldhelm (c. 639–709), Bishop of Sherborne, shrines at Salisbury and Canterbury—25 May
- Alfred the Great (849–899), King of Wessex
- Alphege (954–1012), Archbishop of Canterbury, Martyr—19 April
- Anselm of Canterbury (c. 1033–1109), Archbishop of Canterbury
- Augustine of Canterbury (d. c. 604), first Archbishop of Canterbury—26 May
- Benedict Biscop (c. 628–690), Abbot of Wearmouth—13 January
- Birinus (c. 600–649), Bishop of Dorchester, Apostle of Wessex—4 September (Church of England), 3 December (Roman Catholic)
- Brigid (c. 451–525), Abbess of Kildare—1 February
- Cedd (c. 620–644), Abbot of Lastingham, Bishop of the East Saxons—26 October
- Chad (d. 672), Bishop of Lichfield—2 March
- Charles I of England (1600–1649), King of England, Scotland, and Ireland—30 January
- Columba (521–597), Abbot of Iona, Missionary—9 June
- Crispin and Crispinian (d. c. 286)—25 October. Immortalised as Saint Crispin's Day in Henry V by Shakespeare
- Cuthbert (c. 634–687), Bishop of Lindisfarne—Church of England 29 March; Church in Wales 4 September); Episcopal Church (USA) 31 August
- Dunstan (c. 909–989), Archbishop of Canterbury—19 May
- Edmund the Martyr (d. 869), King of the East Angles, Martyr
- Edward the Confessor (c. 1003 to 1005 – 1066), King of England—13 October (translation of relics)
- Etheldreda (c. 636–679), Abbess of Ely—23 June
- Felix of Burgundy (d. 647 or 648), Bishop, Apostle to the East Angles—8 March
- Frideswide, Prioress at Oxford (Christ Church)
- George, allegedly martyred at Nicomedia in 303, his major shrine was at Constantinople, patron saint of England
- Robert Grosseteste (c. 1175–1253), Bishop of Lincoln, Philosopher, Scientist
- Hilda (c. 614–680), Abbess of Whitby
- Hugh (1135 to 1140–1200), Carthusian monk and Bishop of Lincoln—17 November
- Julian of Norwich (c. 1342 – c. 1416), spiritual writer, mystic—8 May, 13 May
- Margery Kempe (c. 1373 – after 1438), housewife and mystic
- Margaret (c. 1045–1093), Queen of Scotland, mystic—10 June or 16 November
- Mellitus (d. 624), first Bishop of London—24 April
- Mildred (ca. 660–730), Abbess of Minster-in-Thanet—13 July
- Kentigern (d. 614), Bishop of Cumbria—13 January
- Ninian (4th or 5th century), Bishop of Galloway, Apostle of the Picts—16 September
- Osmund (d. 1099), Bishop of Salisbury—4 December
- Oswald (c. 604–642), King of Northumbria, martyr—5 August
- Oswald of Worcester (d. 992), bishop of Worcester—29/28 February
- Paulinus of York (d. 644), Archbishop of York, missionary—10 October
- Petroc (d. c. 564), missionary to the West Country—4 June
- Piran (d. c. 480), patron saint of Cornwall and tinners—5 March
- Richard, Bishop of Chichester (1197–1253)
- Richard Rolle (1290–1349) of Hampole, spiritual writer
- Edmund Rich of Abingdon (1175–1240), Archbishop of Canterbury—16 November
- Swithun (d. c. 862), Bishop of Winchester—15 July in England and 2 July in Norway
- Theodore of Tarsus (602–690), Archbishop of Canterbury—19 September
- Thomas Becket (c. 1118–1170), Archbishop of Canterbury, martyr—29 December
- Thomas de Cantilupe (1218-82), bishop of Hereford—25 August/2 October
- William Tyndale (c. 1494–1536), translator of the Scriptures, martyr—6 October
- The Venerable Bede (672 or 673–735), monk at Jarrow, scholar, historian—western churches 25 May, and Orthodox churches 27 May
- Wilfrid (c. 633-c. 709), bishop, missionary
- William of Ockham (c. 1287–1347), friar, philosopher
- William of York (1141-53), bishop—8 June
- William of Perth (d. ca. 1201), pilgrim, enshrined at Rochester Cathedral—23 May/22 April
- Willibrord of York (c. 658–739), bishop, Apostle of Frisia—7 November
- Wulfstan (d. 1095), Bishop of Worcester—19 January

== Examples of modern Anglican saints ==
The ninth Lambeth Conference held in 1958 clarified the commemoration of Saints and Heroes of the Christian Church in the Anglican Communion. Resolution 79 stated:

- In the case of scriptural saints, care should be taken to commemorate men or women in terms which are in strict accord with the facts made known in Holy Scripture.
- In the case of other names, the Calendar should be limited to those whose historical character and devotion are beyond doubt.
- In the choice of new names economy should be observed and controversial names should not be inserted until they can be seen in the perspective of history.
- The addition of a new name should normally result from a widespread desire expressed in the region concerned over a reasonable period of time.

=== Modern Anglican saints ===
The following have been identified as heroes of the Christian Church in the Anglican Communion (post-Reformation individuals commemorated in the Church of England Calendar, excluding those primarily venerated by the Roman Catholic or Orthodox churches):

- Lancelot Andrewes (1555–1626), Bishop of Winchester, spiritual writer, theologian
- Anthony Ashley-Cooper (1801–1885), Earl of Shaftesbury, social reformer
- Vedanayagam Samuel Azariah (1874–1945), bishop in South India, evangelist
- Samuel Barnett (1844–1913) and Henrietta Barnett (1851–1936), social reformers
- Richard Baxter (1615–1691), Puritan divine
- Dietrich Bonhoeffer (1906–1945), Lutheran pastor, martyr
- William Booth (1829–1912) and Catherine Booth (1829–1890), founders of the Salvation Army
- Thomas Bray (1658–1730), founder of the SPCK
- John Bunyan (1628–1688), spiritual writer
- Joseph Butler (1692–1752), Bishop of Durham, philosopher
- Josephine Butler (1828–1906), social reformer
- John Calvin (1509–1564), reformer
- Wilson Carlile (1847–1942), founder of the Church Army
- Edith Cavell (1865–1915), nurse
- Charles I (1600–1649), king and martyr
- Caroline Chisholm (1808–1877), social reformer
- Thomas Cranmer (1489–1556), Archbishop of Canterbury, Reformation martyr
- John Donne (1572–1631), priest, poet
- Elizabeth Ferard (1825–1883), first Deaconess of the Church of England, founder of the Community of St Andrew
- Nicholas Ferrar (1592–1637), deacon, founder of the Little Gidding community
- George Fox (1624–1691), founder of the Society of Friends (the Quakers)
- Elizabeth Fry (1780–1845), prison reformer
- Allen Gardiner (1794–1851), missionary, founder of the South American Mission Society
- Isabella Gilmore (1842–1923), deaconess
- Charles Gore (1853–1932), bishop, founder of the Community of the Resurrection
- James Hannington (1847–1885), bishop of Eastern Equatorial Africa, martyr in Uganda
- George Herbert (1593–1633), priest, poet
- Octavia Hill (1838–1912), social reformer
- Richard Hooker (1554–1600), priest, apologist, theologian
- Eglantyne Jebb (1876–1928), social reformer, founder of 'Save The Children'
- Samuel Johnson (1709–1784), moralist
- John Keble (1792–1866), priest, tractarian, poet
- Thomas Ken (1637–1711), Bishop of Bath and Wells
- Geoffrey Studdert Kennedy (1883–1929), priest, poet
- Edward King (1829–1920), Bishop of Lincoln
- Apolo Kivebulaya (c. 1864–1933), priest, evangelist in Central Africa
- Ini Kopuria (d. 1945), founder of the Melanesian Brotherhood
- Hugh Latimer (c. 1487–1555), Bishop of Worcester, Reformation martyr
- William Laud (1573–1645), Archbishop of Canterbury
- William Law (1686–1761), priest, spiritual writer,
- Charles Fuge Lowder (1820–1880), priest
- Martin Luther (1483–1546), reformer
- Janani Luwum (c. 1922–1977), Archbishop of Uganda, martyr
- Frederick Denison Maurice (1805–1872), priest
- Henry Martyn (1781–1812), translator of the Scriptures, missionary in India and Persia
- Bernard Mizeki (c. 1861–1896), apostle of the MaShona, martyr
- Harriet Monsell (1811–1883), founder of the Community of St John Baptist
- John Mason Neale (1818–1866), priest, hymn writer
- John Henry Newman (1801–1890), Cardinal, tractarian, theologian
- Florence Nightingale (1820–1910), nurse, social reformer
- John Coleridge Patteson (1827–1871), first Bishop of Melanesia and martyr
- Edward Bouverie Pusey (1800–1882), priest, tractarian
- Pandita Mary Ramabai (1858–1922), translator of the Scriptures
- Nicholas Ridley (c. 1500–1555), Bishop of London, Reformation martyr
- Óscar Romero (1917–1980), Roman Catholic Archbishop of San Salvador, martyr
- Christina Rossetti (1830–1894), poet
- Samuel Seabury (1729–1796), first Anglican bishop in North America
- Priscilla Lydia Sellon, a restorer of the religious life in the Church of England
- George Augustus Selwyn (1809–1878), first Anglican Bishop of New Zealand
- Sadhu Sundar Singh (1889– 1929?), evangelist, teacher of the Faith
- Mary Slessor (1848–1915), missionary in West Africa
- Mary Sumner (1828–1921), founder of the Mothers' Union
- Jeremy Taylor (1613–1667), Bishop of Down and Connor
- William Temple (1881–1944), Archbishop of Canterbury
- Thomas Traherne (1636 or 1637–1674), poet, spiritual writer
- William Tyndale (c. 1494–1536), translator of the Scriptures, Reformation martyr
- Evelyn Underhill (1875–1941), spiritual writer
- Henry Venn (1725–1797), John Venn (1759–1813), and Henry Venn the younger (1796–1873), priests, evangelical divines
- Isaac Watts (1674–1748), hymn writer
- Charles Wesley (1707–1788), evangelist, hymn writer
- John Wesley (1703–1791), priest, evangelist, founder of Methodism
- John West (1778–1845), missionary and the first Anglican priest in Western Canada
- William Wilberforce (1759–1833), social reformer

== See also ==
- List of Anglican Church calendars
- List of saints
- Saints in Methodism
