= John Ferrar =

London merchant (1588–1657)

John Ferrar (2 December 1588 – 28 December 1657) was a London merchant and brother of Nicholas Ferrar the Younger. (Note: This John Ferrar is not to be confused with John Ferrar the Elder of Croxton and London, Esquire, father of Councillor William Farrar.) The son of Nicholas Ferrar the Elder, he was deputy governor and treasurer of the Virginia Company of London under Edwin Sandys.

== Career ==
Ferrar was born on 2 December 1588, the third son of Mary Ferrar née Wodenoth and Nicholas Ferrar the Elder, Master of the Skinners' Guild of St Sithes Lane in London. John and his brother Nicholas were second only to the governor in their importance to the company; Peter Peckard describes him as Deputy Governor of the company, becoming king's councilor for the plantation. John Ferrar and his brother were influential in the drafting of the "Great Charter" of 1618, which established self-governance in Virginia.

=== Virginia Company and Virginian self-governance ===
Ferrar was elected treasurer—effectively deputy governor—to Sir Edwin Sandys on 23 April 1619 and went on to play a significant role in the Virginia Company. He and his brother Nicholas were instrumental in the company's management, administration and preservation in the Americas. Charles. M Gayley believed that, "these Men and their fellow patriots were already, by the charters of 1609 [and] 1618, the founders of representative government in Virginia, and by the 1620 Charter of representative government in New England as well".

The Virginia Company held its meetings at the house of Nicholas Ferrar the Elder, father of John and Nicholas, who was Master of the Skinners guild and one of the first shareholders in the Virginia Company of London. Sir Edwin Sandys, John Ferrar and his brother Nicholas made changes that resulted in the growth of the Virginia colony from 1,000 people in 1618 to over 2,200 in 1619. The years 1618-1619 are significant because they are the years of the "Great Charter", in which a set of instructions were given to the newly appointed Governor Sir George Yeardley. The birth of representative government in the United States can be traced from this “Great Charter” as it provided for self-governance from which the House of Burgesses and a General Council appointed by the Governor were created.

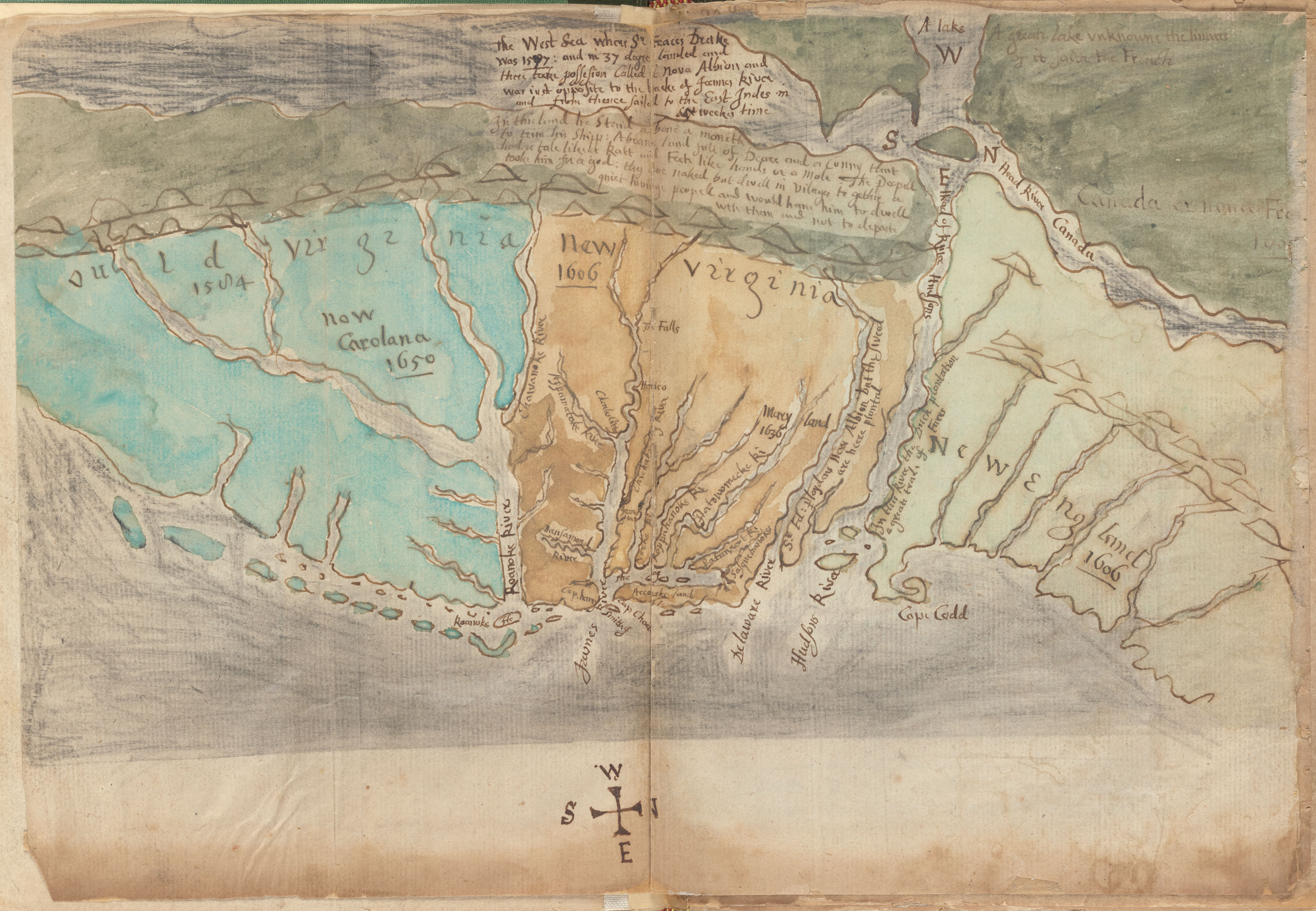
"A mapp of Virginia", credited to John Ferrar

On 24 July 1621 the treasurer, council and company of adventurers and planters for the Virginia Company of London passed an Ordinance and Constitution that codified the instructions sent in 1619.

Little is known of this John Ferrar other than in the numerous documents of the Virginia Company and the Ferrar papers. "Between 1619 and 1622, factions developed within the company as a result of the administration of Samuel Argall deputy governor of the colony. Argall's exploitation of the lands and the trade of the company for private benefit; led to the formation of an administration under Lord Cavendish, John Ferrar, Nicholas Ferrar, Sir Edwin Sandys, Treasurer and Earl of Southampton .. The Sandys-Southampton party supported the parliamentary opposition in England, and thus the king and Sandys became bitter political rivals."

The Parliamentarian faction of the company blamed John Ferrar for the financial problems of the company caused by Edwin Sandys. On 24 May 1624, the company was dissolved, terminating in bankruptcy, and on 15 July, a commission was appointed to replace the Virginia Company of London and establish the first royal colony in America. However the representative government, the House of Burgesses, that resulted from the first and second charters remained in place.

== Later life ==
During the English Civil War, Ferrar gave refuge at the Little Gidding community to Charles I, pursued by Cromwell's roundheads, but soon realised that his house was sufficiently well known to draw the parliamentarians' attentions. Ferrar escorted the king to Coppingford, where the latter spent the night before leaving for Stamford.

Ferrar wrote a full-length life of his brother Nicholas, which was never, however, published, and only part of which survives in a copy made by the 17th-century antiquarian, Thomas Baker.

Ferrer died on 28 December 1657; a brass plaque commemorating him is in St John's Church, Little Gidding. He had made his daughter Virginia Ferrar his executor and not his wife or his son. His bequests included property in Bermuda which he left to his independent daughter.
