= The Art of the Engine Driver =

Book by Steven Carroll

- First edition
- Author: Steven Carroll
- Language: English
- Publisher: HarperCollins, Australia
- Publication date: 2001
- Publication place: Australia
- Media type: Print (Paperback)
- Pages: 278 pp
- ISBN: 0-7322-7057-X
- OCLC: 52334941
- Dewey Decimal: 823/.914 21
- LC Class: PR9619.3.C382 A88 2001
- Preceded by: Spirit of Progress
- Followed by: The Gift of Speed

The Art of the Engine Driver is a 2001 novel by Australian author Steven Carroll.

It is the first in a sequence of novels written by Carroll, followed by The Gift of Speed and The Time We Have Taken. Inspired by a dream, the book was originally intended to be a stand-alone novel.

== Awards ==
- Prix Femina (France), Best Foreign Novel, 2005: shortlisted
- Miles Franklin Literary Award, 2002: shortlisted

== Reviews ==
- "Light the Shade" weblog
- Readings
