= Nicholas Ferrar =

English scholar, courtier and church innovator 1592–1637

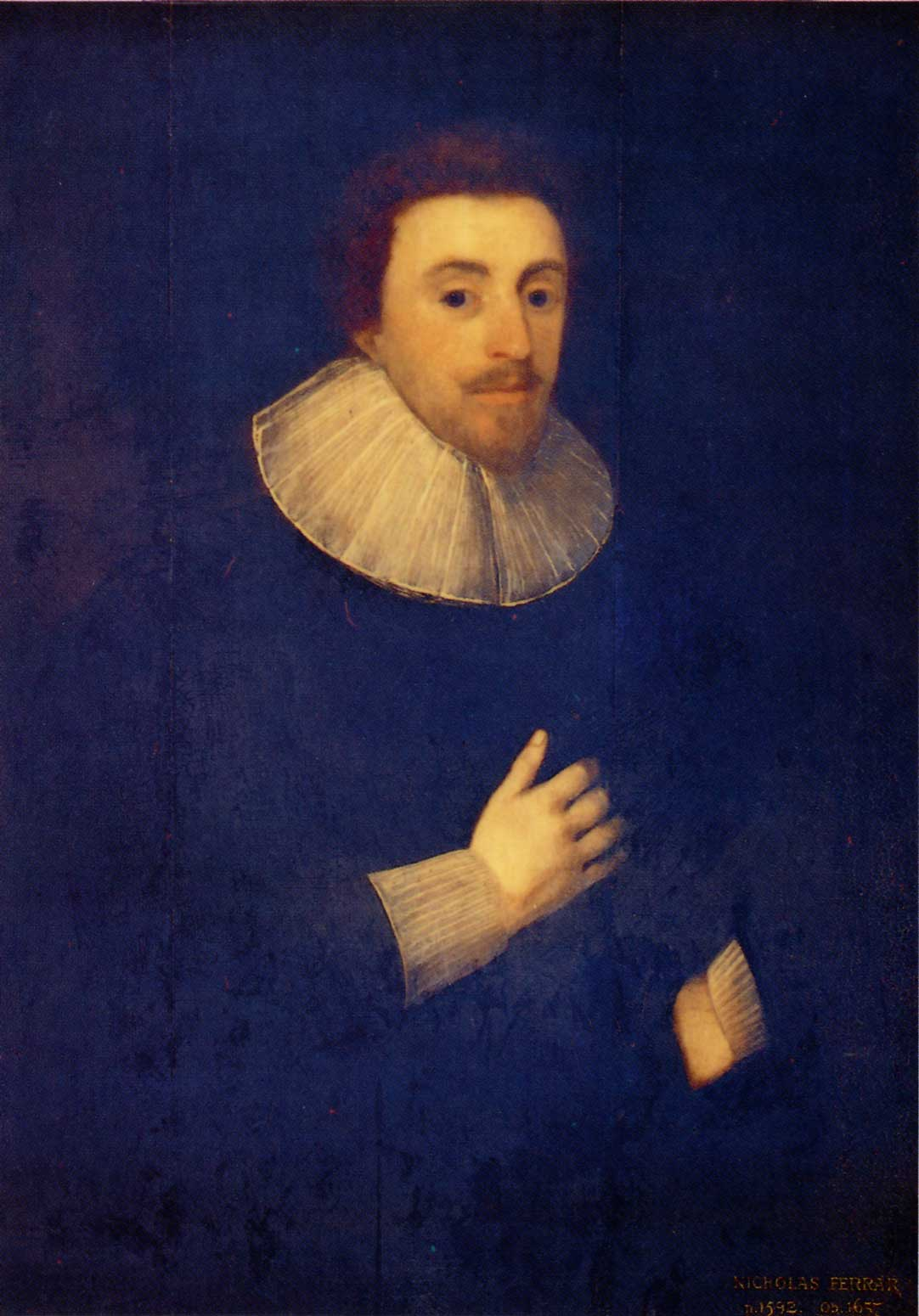
- Nicholas Ferrar, from a portrait by Cornelius Janssens, the original of which hangs in Magdalene College, Cambridge, alongside those of his parents.

Deacon, Founder of the Little Gidding Community
- Born: 22 February 1592; City of London, England
- Died: 4 December 1637 (aged 45); Little Gidding, Huntingdonshire, England
- Venerated in: Anglican Communion
- Feast: 4 December (Church of England), 1 December (Episcopal Church (US) and Southern Africa)

Nicholas Ferrar (22 February 1592 – 4 December 1637) was an English scholar, courtier and businessman, who was ordained a deacon in the Church of England. He lost much of his fortune in the Virginia Company and retreated with his extended family in 1626 to the manor of Little Gidding, Huntingdonshire, for his remaining years, in an informal spiritual community following High Anglican practice. His friend the poet and Anglican priest George Herbert (1593–1633), on his deathbed, sent Ferrar the manuscript of The Temple, telling him to publish the poetry if it might "turn to the advantage of any dejected poor soul." "If not, let him burn it; for I and it are less than the least of God's mercies." Ferrar published the verses in 1633; they remain in print.

== Early life ==
Nicholas Ferrar was born in the City of London, England the third son and fifth child (of six) of Nicholas Ferrar and his wife Mary Ferrar (née Wodenoth). He is sometimes identified as Nicholas Ferrar the Younger while his father is identified as Nicholas Ferrar the Elder. Having been sent to a nearby school, he is said to have been reading perfectly by the age of five. He was confirmed by the Bishop of London in 1598, contriving to have the bishop lay hands on him twice. In 1600 he was sent away to boarding school in Berkshire, and in 1605, aged 13, he entered Clare Hall, Cambridge. He was elected a fellow-commoner at the end of his first year, took his BA in 1610 and elected a fellow the following year.

== Travels abroad ==
Ferrar suffered from poor health and was advised to travel to continental Europe, away from the damp air of Cambridge. He obtained a position in the retinue of Princess Elizabeth, daughter of James I who married the Elector Frederick V. In April 1613 he left England with the princess, not returning until 1618.

By May he had left the Court to travel alone. Over the next few years he visited the Dutch Republic, Austria, Bohemia, Italy and Spain, learning to speak Dutch, German, Italian and Spanish. He studied at Leipzig and especially at Padua, where he continued his medical studies. He met Anabaptists and Roman Catholics, including Jesuits and Oratorians, as well as Jews, broadening his religious education. During this time Ferrar recorded many adventures in his letters home to his family and friends. In 1618 he is said to have had a vision that he was needed at home, and so he returned to England.

== Virginia Company ==
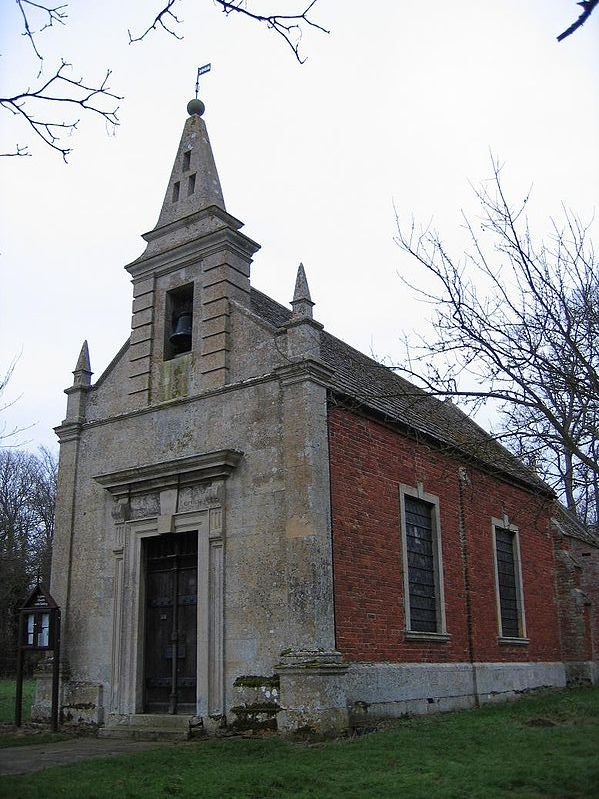
St John's Church, Little Gidding, as rebuilt in 1714

The Ferrar family was deeply involved in the Virginia Company of London. His family home was often visited by Sir Walter Raleigh, half-brother of Sir Humphrey Gilbert. Upon returning to London, Ferrar found that the family fortunes, primarily invested in Virginia, were under threat.

Ferrar entered the Parliament of England, serving briefly as Member of Parliament for Lymington in 1624, and worked with Sir Edwin Sandys. They were part of a parliamentary faction (the "country party" or "patriot party") that seized control of the government's finances from a rival "court faction", and were grouped around Robert Rich, 2nd Earl of Warwick. The court faction supported Sir Thomas Smythe (or Smith), also a prominent member of the East India Company. Smythe as treasurer of the Virginia Company from 1609 to 1620 encouraged the governor to end evangelisation of Native Americans and expand tobacco culture.

Ferrar wrote a 16-page pamphlet criticising Smythe's management. (Note: This pamphlet was presented to the members of the Roxburghe Club by the Duke of Devonshire, but it was not published until 1990. Ferrar alleged that Smith and his son-in-law, Alderman Robert Johnson, were running a company within a company to skim off the profits from the shareholders. He also alleged that Dr John Woodall had bought some Polish settlers as white slaves, and sold them again in Virginia to Lord de La Warr. Ferrar said that Smith was trying to reduce other colonists to slavery by extending their period of indenture indefinitely beyond the seventh year.) Smythe (as he spelt his name) was criticised by rivals for allegedly skimming profits, but an investigation revealed no wrongdoing and he continued to enjoy the support of the king. The argument ended with the London Virginia Company losing its charter after a court decision in May 1624.

== At Little Gidding ==
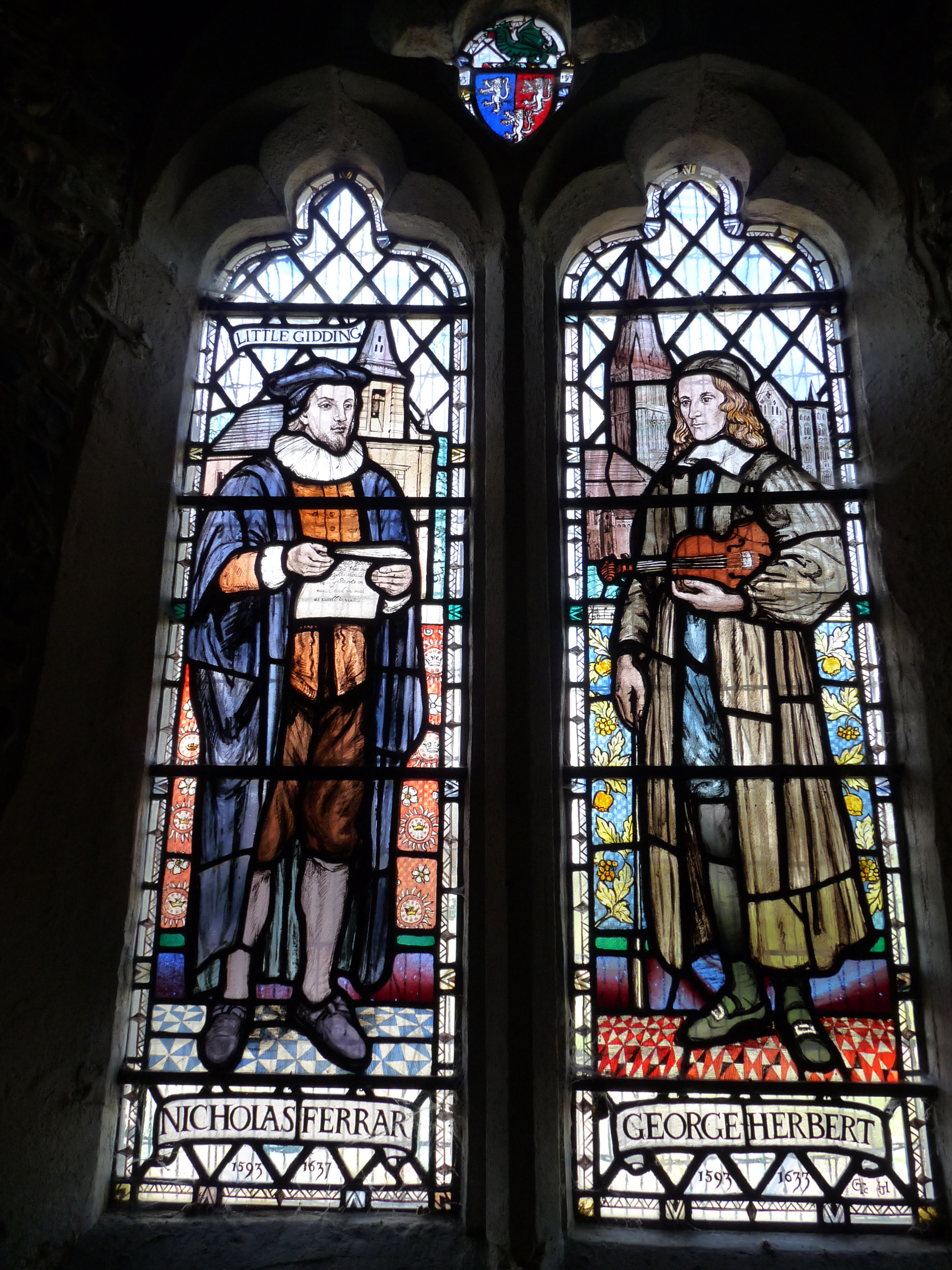
Stained-glass window at St Andrew's church, Bemerton, of Ferrar and George Herbert

In 1626 Ferrar and his extended family left London and moved to the largely deserted village of Little Gidding in Huntingdonshire. The household centred on the Ferrar family: Nicholas's mother, his brother John Ferrar (with his wife Bathsheba and their children), and his sister Susanna, with her husband John Collett and their children. They bought the manor of Little Gidding and restored the abandoned little church for their use. The household always had someone at prayer and had a strict routine. They tended to the health and education of local children. Ferrar and his family produced harmonies of the Gospels that survive today as some of the finest in Britain. Many of the family also learned the art of bookbinding, apparently from the daughter of a Cambridge bookbinder, whose style they worked in.

In 1633 the poet George Herbert, on his deathbed, sent the manuscript of The Temple to Nicholas Ferrar, telling him to publish the poems if he thought they might "turn to the advantage of any dejected poor soul", and otherwise, to burn them. Ferrar arranged to publish them that year. The Temple: Sacred Poems and Private Ejaculations (1633) had gone through eight editions by 1690.

Nicholas Ferrar died on 4 December 1637 aged 45, but the extended family continued their way of life without him. After his siblings John Ferrar and Susanna Ferrar Collett died in 1657 within a month of each other, the larger community began to disband.

Puritans criticised the life of the Ferrar household, denouncing them as Arminians, and saying they lived as in a "Protestant nunnery". However, the Ferrars never lived a formal religious life: there was no Rule, vows were not taken, and there was no enclosure. In this sense there was no "community" at Little Gidding, but rather a family living a Christian life in accordance with the Book of Common Prayer, according to High Church principles.

The fame of the Ferrar household was widespread, and attracted many visitors. Among them was King Charles I, who visited Little Gidding three times. He briefly took refuge there in 1645 after the Battle of Naseby.

== Legacy and honours ==
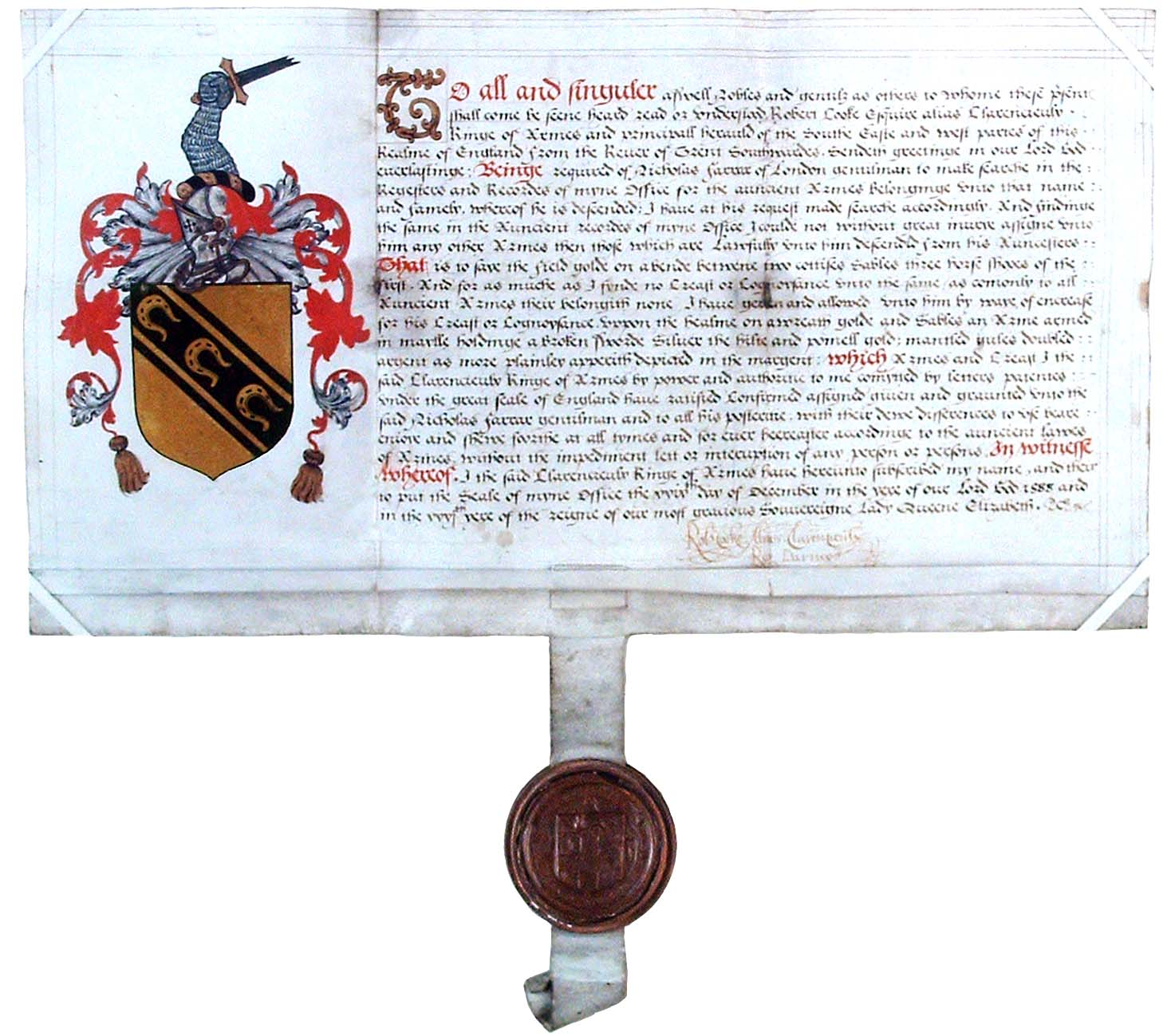
Armorial Bearings for Nicholas Ferrar

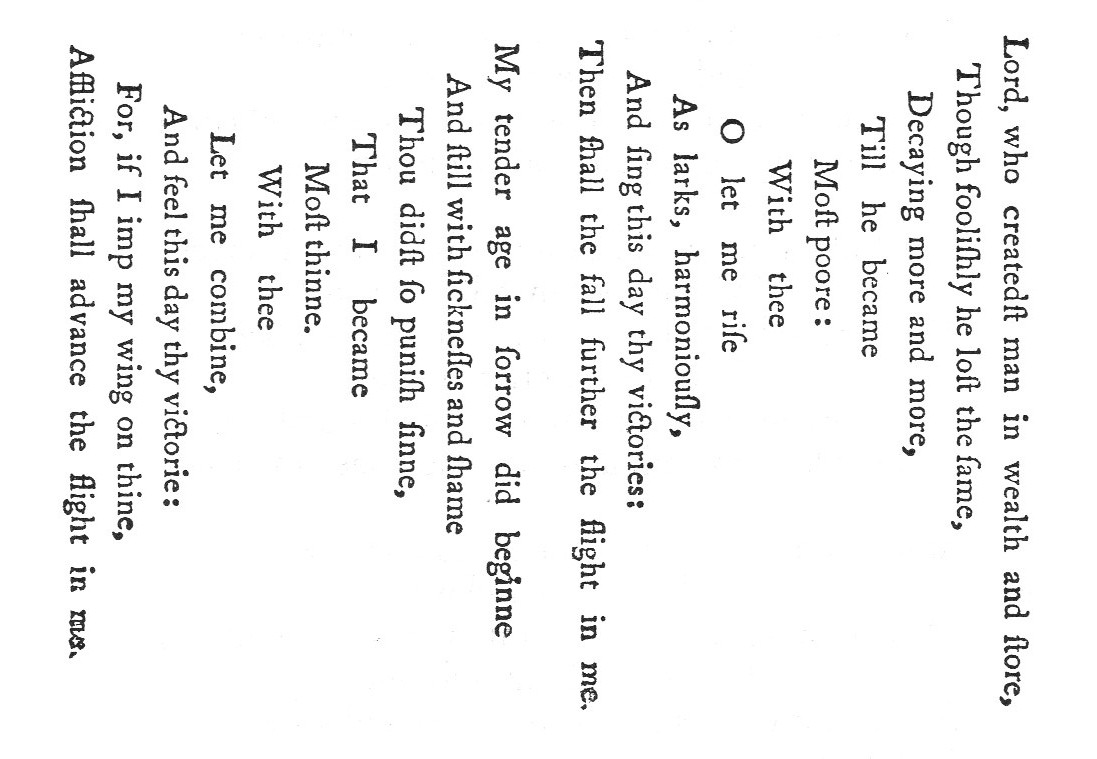
"Easter Wings", an example of the "pattern poems" in George Herbert's The Temple, a book which Ferrar edited and had published. The lines of the poem were arranged to be printed sideways, with each stanza forming an image meant to suggest a bird flying up with outstretched wings.

Nicholas Ferrar is commemorated in the calendar of the Church of England on 4 December, the date of his death. In the calendar of the Episcopal Church in the United States, the Anglican Church of Southern Africa and the Church in Wales, he is commemorated on 1 December.

T. S. Eliot honoured Nicholas Ferrar in the Four Quartets, naming one of the quartets Little Gidding. The Friends of Little Gidding were founded in 1946 by Alan Maycock with the patronage of Eliot, to maintain and adorn the church at Little Gidding, and honour the life of Ferrar and his family and their place in the village. The Friends organise an annual pilgrimage to Ferrar's tomb, formerly held each July, but in recent years in May (the month when Eliot visited Little Gidding) and celebrate Nicholas Ferrar Day on the Saturday nearest to 4 December.

A new religious community was founded at Little Gidding in the 1970s, inspired by the example of Ferrar and called the Community of Christ the Sower, but it disbanded in 1998. The Pilsdon Community in Dorset was also based on Ferrar's Little Gidding model.

The former Poet Laureate Ted Hughes was directly related to Nicholas Ferrar on his mother's side. Hughes and his wife, the poet Sylvia Plath, named their son Nicholas Farrar Hughes. The family evidently used both spellings of the surname.

Nicholas Ferrar is regarded as patron of the Oratory of the Good Shepherd, an international Anglican religious community.

== See also ==
- Little Gidding (poem)
- Saints in Anglicanism
- St John's Church, Little Gidding

Parliament of England
Preceded by Sir William Doddington; Henry Crompton	Member of Parliament for Lymington; 1624; With: John More	Succeeded by John Button; John Mills
