= Little Gidding (poem) =

1942 poem by T. S. Eliot

Little Gidding is the fourth and final poem of T. S. Eliot's Four Quartets, a series of poems that discuss time, perspective, humanity, and salvation. It was first published in September 1942 after being delayed for over a year because of the air-raids on Great Britain during World War II and Eliot's declining health. The title refers to a small Anglican community in Little Gidding in Huntingdonshire, established by Nicholas Ferrar in the 17th century and scattered during the English Civil War.

The poem uses the combined image of fire and Pentecostal fire to emphasise the need for purification and purgation. According to the poet, humanity's flawed understanding of life and turning away from God leads to a cycle of warfare, but this can be overcome by recognising the lessons of the past. Within the poem, the narrator meets a ghost that is a combination of various poets and literary figures. Little Gidding focuses on the unity of past, present, and future, and claims that understanding this unity is necessary for salvation.

== Background ==
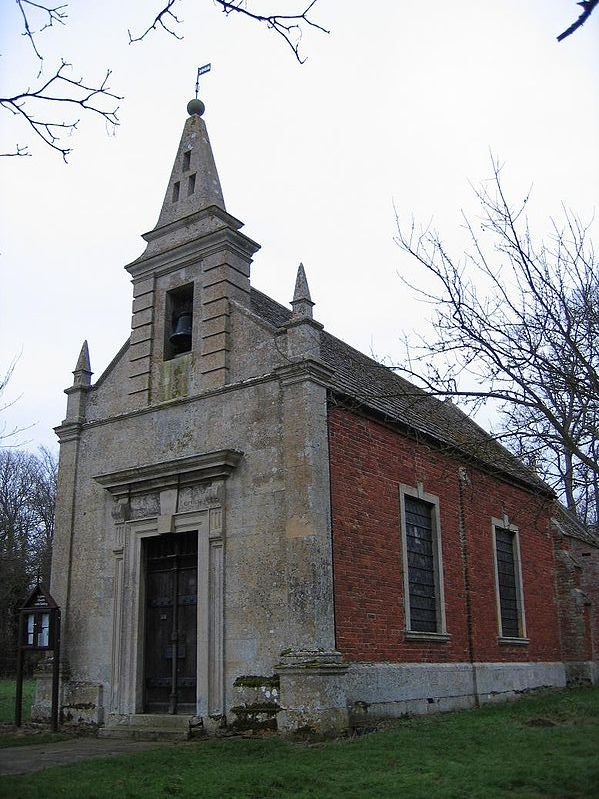
St John's Church, Little Gidding, as rebuilt in 1714

Following the completion of the third Four Quartets poem, The Dry Salvages, Eliot's health declined and he stayed in Shamley Green, Surrey, while he recovered. During this time, Eliot started writing Little Gidding. The first draft was completed in July 1941 but he was dissatisfied with it. He believed the problems with the poem lay with his own inability to write, and that, precipitated by air raids on London, he had started the poem with too little preparation and had written it too quickly. After the first draft was written, he set the poem aside, and he left in September to lecture throughout Great Britain.

It was not until August 1942 that he started working on it again. In total, there were five drafts. The poem was finished by 19 September 1942 and published in the October New English Weekly. Little Gidding was intended to conclude the Four Quartets series, summarising Eliot's views expressed in this series of poems.

Little Gidding was the home of an Anglican community established in 1626 by Nicholas Ferrar. The Ferrar household lived a Christian life according to High Church principles and the Book of Common Prayer. The religious community was dispersed during the English Civil War between Parliamentarians and Royalists but re-formed, ending with the death of John Ferrar in 1657. Eliot had visited the site in May 1936.

Unlike the other locations mentioned in the titles of the Four Quartets poems, Eliot had no direct connection to the original Christian community. As such, the community is supposed to represent almost any religious community.

== Poem ==
Critics classify Little Gidding as a poem of fire with an emphasis on purgation and the Pentecostal fire. The beginning of the poem discusses time and winter, with attention paid to the arrival of summer. The images of snow, which provoke desires for a spiritual life, transition into an analysis of the four classical elements of fire, earth, air and water and how fire is the primary element of the four. Following this is a discussion on death and destruction, things unaccomplished, and regret for past events. The section evokes a spiritual pilgrimage to Little Gidding, a site associated with prayer and community, emphasizing that the journey is not about verification or gaining knowledge but about spiritual stillness and transformation. A "timeless moment" emerges, suggesting an intersection of the human and divine.

While using Dante's terza rima style, the second section continues the poem by describing the Battle of Britain. The image of warfare merges with the depiction of Pentecost, the Holy Spirit juxtaposed with air-raids on London. A ghost, representing poets of the past stuck between worlds, begins talking to the narrator of the poem. The ghost discusses change, art in general, and how humankind is flawed, revealing the futility of clinging to past achievements and the importance of accepting both failures and accomplishments. The ghost emphasizes that spiritual refinement comes through suffering, while moving forward requires letting go of old patterns and embracing deeper understanding. The only way to overcome humanity's problematic condition, according to the ghost, is to experience purgation through fire. The fire is described in a manner similar to the medieval mystic Julian of Norwich's writing about God's love and discussed in relationship to the shirt of Nessus, a shirt that burns its wearer.

The third section introduces "the spectre of a rose", and examines different forms of attachment and detachment. True spiritual liberation involves expanding love beyond desire. On the paradoxical nature of memory, the poem suggests that while history can be a form of servitude, it can also be a path to freedom when transfigured into something meaningful. The famous phrase "All shall be well" points to the redemptive power of divine grace, echoing Julian of Norwich's vision of ultimate reconciliation.

The fourth section describes the descent of the Holy Spirit as a "dove descending" that brings both terror and purification. Love, depicted as a divine force, both redeems and consumes, demanding a complete surrender to God's will. The section highlights the theme of being "redeemed from fire by fire," symbolizing the need to spiritually transform through intense experiences of suffering and grace.

Little Gidding continues by describing the eternalness of the present and how history exists in a pattern. The final section reflects on the cyclical nature of time, emphasizing that what humans call endings are often new beginnings. The poem connects the journey of life to the continuous exploration of spiritual truths, where ultimate understanding lies in arriving back at one's starting point but seeing it anew ("We shall not cease from exploration, and the end of all our exploring will be to arrive where we started, and know the place for the first time"). The imagery of fire and the rose merging symbolizes the union of divine love and human experience, completing the cycle of spiritual renewal. The poem concludes by explaining how sacrifice is needed to allow an individual to die into life and be reborn, and that salvation should be the goal of humankind.

== Themes ==
In terms of renewal, Eliot believed that suffering was needed for all of society before new life could begin. The original Little Gidding community was built for living on monastic lines, but the community was damaged and dispersed by Puritan forces during the English Civil War in 1646. St John's Church, Little Gidding, the centre of the community, was restored in 1714 and again in 1853. The image of religious renewal is combined with the image of the London air-raids and the constant fighting and destruction within the world. This compound image is used to discuss the connection of holy places with the Holy Spirit, Pentecost, communion with the dead, and the repetition of history. The theme is also internal to Eliot's own poems; the image of the rose garden at the end Little Gidding is the image that begins Burnt Norton and the journey is made circular. Also, the depiction of time within the poem is similar to the way time operates within The Family Reunion.

Like the other poems making up the Four Quartets, Little Gidding deals with the past, present, and future, and humanity's place within them as each generation is seemingly united. In the second section, there is a ghost who is the compilation of various poets, including Dante, Swift, Yeats, and others. When the ghost joins the poet, the narrator states "Knowing myself yet being someone other". This suggests that the different times merge at the same time that the different personalities begin to merge, allowing a communication and connection with the dead. Later, in the fourth section, humanity is given a choice between the Holy Spirit or the bombing of London; redemption or destruction. God's love allows humankind to be redeemed and escape the living hell through purgation by fire. The end of the poem describes how Eliot has attempted to help the world as a poet. He parallels his work in language with working on the soul or working on society.

The ghost, a combination of many literary figures, was originally addressed in the poem as "Ser Brunetto" before being revised as an ambiguous "you". "Ser Brunetto" was Dante's way of addressing Brunetto Latini, a former mentor whom he meets in Hell to which he has been condemned for sodomy. Eliot, in a letter to John Hayward dated 27 August 1942, explained why he changed the wording:

I think you will recognise that it was necessary to get rid of Brunetto for two reasons. The first is that the visionary figure has now become somewhat more definite and will no doubt be identified by some readers with Yeats though I do not mean anything so precise as that. However, I do not wish to take the responsibility of putting Yeats or anybody else into Hell and I do not want to impute to him the particular vice which took Brunetto there. Secondly, although the reference to that Canto is intended to be explicit, I wish the effect of the whole to be Purgatorial which is more appropriate. That brings us to the reference to swimming in fire which you will remember at the end of Purgatorio 26 where the poets are found.

The theme of swimming through flames is connected to the depiction of Guido Guinizelli, a poet who influenced Dante, seeking such a state in Purgatorio XXVI. However, the depiction of swimming was transformed into an image of dancing, an act that appears throughout Yeats's poetry, within purgatorial flames. The critic Dominic Manganiello suggests that, in combining the image of dancing with purgation, Eliot merges Dante's and Yeats's poetic themes.

== Sources ==
At one point in the poem, Eliot used terza rima rhyme in a manner similar to Dante. In a 1950 lecture, he discussed how he imitated Dante in Little Gidding and the challenges that this presented. The lecture also dwelt on keeping to a set form and how Dante's poetry is the model for religious poetry and poetry in general. Besides Dante, many of the images used in Little Gidding were allusions to Eliot's earlier poems, especially the other poems of the Four Quartets.

Eliot included other literary sources in the poem: Stéphane Mallarmé, W. B. Yeats, Jonathan Swift, Arnaut Daniel, Nijinsky's dancing in Le Spectre de la Rose, and Shakespeare's Hamlet. Religious images were used to connect the poem to the writings of Julian of Norwich, to the life and death of Thomas Wentworth, 1st Earl of Strafford, to William Laud, to Charles I, and to John Milton. Eliot relied on theological statements similar to those of Alfred, Lord Tennyson's In Memoriam and Thomas Hardy's The Impercipient. The Bible also played a large role in the poem, especially in discussions on the Holy Spirit and Pentecost. Many commentators have pointed out the influence of George Herbert in the poem, but Eliot, in a letter to Anne Ridler dated 10 March 1941, stated that he was trying to avoid such connections in Little Gidding.

== Reception ==
Critics such as Malcolm Cowley and Delmore Schwartz describe mixed emotions about the religiosity of the poem. Cowley emphasised the mystical nature of the poem and how its themes were closer to Buddhism than Anglicanism while mentioning his appreciation of many of the passages. Schwartz also mentioned the Buddhist images and his admiration for many of the lines in Little Gidding. F. B. Pinion believed that the fourth section of the poem caused "Eliot more trouble and vexation than any passage of the same length he ever wrote, and is his greatest achievement in the Four Quartets."

E. M. Forster did not like Eliot's emphasis on pain and responded to the poem: "Of course there's pain on and off through each individual's life... You can't shirk it and so on. But why should it be endorsed by the schoolmaster and sanctified by the priest until the fire and the rose are one when so much of it is caused by disease and bullies? It is here that Eliot becomes unsatisfactory as a seer." Writing in 2003, Roger Scruton wrote that in Little Gidding Eliot achieved "that for which he envies Dante—namely, a poetry of belief, in which belief and words are one, and in which the thought cannot be prized free from the controlled and beautiful language."
