= Hamlet and the New Poetic =

1983 book by William H. Quillian

- Author: William H. Quillian
- Language: English
- Subject: James Joyce; T. S. Eliot; Hamlet; Literary criticism
- Publisher: UMI press
- Publication date: 1983
- Publication place: United States

Hamlet and the New Poetic is a book of literary criticism on James Joyce, T. S. Eliot and Hamlet by American professor William H. Quillian, originally published in 1983.

== Overview ==
Hamlet and the New Poetic is an exploration of critical readings of Hamlet during the 19th and 20th centuries. During the Victorian era, Quillian argues, there was an "enormous and positive hold that Hamlet exerted on the literary imagination." This was followed by a "shift in perception" during the period of Modernism (c. 1911–1922) when T. S. Eliot and James Joyce condemned the play as a "failure." Jackson Bryer notes that this text includes an "informative reading" of Eliot's "Hamlet and His Problems" followed by "Eliot's changing attitudes towards this play in his later work."

== Reviews ==
- Cheng, Vincent John. "Review of William Quillian's Hamlet and the New Poetic: Joyce and Eliot." James Joyce Quarterly, 24, No. 1 (Fall 1986), 101–106.
- Kidd, John. "The Genetic Joyce: A Retrospective Review," The James Joyce Literary Supplement 1.2 (Fall 1987): 11.
