= Searching for Juliet =

2023 non-fiction book by Sophie Duncan

Searching for Juliet: The Lives and Deaths of Shakespeare’s First Tragic Heroine
- Author: Sophie Duncan
- Publisher: Sceptre
- Publication date: 6 April 2023
- Publication place: United Kingdom
- Pages: 320
- ISBN: 978-1529365177

Searching for Juliet: The Lives and Deaths of Shakespeare's First Tragic Heroine is a book written by Sophie Duncan, a research fellow at Magdalen College, Oxford, published by Sceptre in 2023. The book is a cultural, historical, and literary exploration of the birth, death, and legacy of Juliet Capulet.

The book has received positive reviews. In Literary Review Kirsten Tambling described it as "a witty and illuminating account" that "explores how Juliet has been conceived, reworked and reimagined in Western culture from her first appearance in the 16th century to the present day". In The Times Sophie Elmhirst praises the book as a "roving, animated quest" adding that "Duncan approaches her subject from all angles, turning Juliet like a gem in the light". Writing in The Guardian, Samantha Ellis describes the book as "invigorating cultural investigation of Shakespeare’s heroine", and Duncan as "an engaging guide to Juliet’s complex afterlives". In The Daily Telegraph Jonathan Bate describes the book as "witty and scholarly". For The Times Literary Supplement Margreta de Grazia described the book as "a buoyant account", adding that "[Duncan's] book is richly informed by the ideological, commercial, political and personal motivations behind the many viewpoints she uncovers". In Prospect Rhodri Lewis writes that "Duncan is a deft, compelling and thoroughly researched guide".

A paperback edition was published in April 2024. In May 2024 it was shortlisted for the Society for Theatre Research Book Prize.
