= Michael Groden =

Canadian academic

- Born: 30 May 1947; Buffalo, New York, U.S.
- Died: 25 March 2021 (aged 73); Toronto, Canada
- Occupation: Professor
- Spouse: Molly Peacock (m. 1992)
- Writing career
- Genres: 19th & 20th century British literature History of criticism and critical theory
- Subject: James Joyce

Michael Groden (30 May 1947 – 25 March 2021) was a distinguished professor of English at the University of Western Ontario.

== Life and career ==
Born in Buffalo, New York on 30 May 1947, Groden received a B.A. from Dartmouth College (magna cum laude) in 1969 and an M.A. and Ph.D. from Princeton University in 1975, where he studied James Joyce's writing methods through close textual analyses of his manuscripts under the supervision of A. Walton Litz. He is known for his involvement in the envisioning and development of James Joyce's Ulysses as hypertext and hypermedia with William H. Quillian and other scholars from around the world. Groden was also an advisor to the National Library of Ireland in their acquisition of a large collection of James Joyce manuscripts in 2002.

Groden wrote extensively of his life, his lifelong analysis of Ulysses, and his relationship with the poet, essayist and biographer Molly Peacock in his memoir, The Necessary Fiction: Life with James Joyce's Ulysses (2019). Peacock also wrote of their relationship and marriage in The Paper Garden (2011) and in Flower Diary: Mary Hiester Reid Paints, Travels, Marries & Opens a Door (2021). They lived together in Toronto until his death on 25 March 2021.

Groden was the recipient of an honorary D.Litt. degree from University College Dublin in 2004, the centenary of Bloomsday; in 2007, he was made a fellow of the Royal Society of Canada. His James Joyce papers will be deposited at the University at Buffalo and his teaching papers at the University of Western Ontario.

== Publications ==
- The Necessary Fiction: Life with James Joyce's Ulysses, Edward Everett Root Publishers Co. Ltd., 2019, ISBN 978-1-911454-39-7 (hardcover), ISBN 978-1-913087-52-4 (paperback).
- Ulysses in Focus: Genetic, Textual and Personal Views, University Press of Florida, 2010, ISBN 978-0-8130-4172-8
- Co-Editor, with Martin Kreiswirth, and Imre Szeman, The Johns Hopkins Guide to Literary Theory & Criticism, Johns Hopkins Press, 2005–2012, ISBN 978-0-8018-8010-0
- "The National Library of Ireland's New Joyce Manuscripts: An Outline and Archive Comparisons", in Joyce Studies Annual, Vol. 14 (Summer 2003), pp. 5–17.
- James Joyce's Manuscripts: An Index, Taylor and Francis, 1980, ISBN 978-0-8240-9540-6
- General Editor, with Hans Walter Gabler, David Hayman, A. Walton Litz, and Danis Rose, The James Joyce Archive; 63 volumes; Garland Publishing, 1977–1979.
- Ulysses in Progress, Princeton University Press, 1977. Princeton Legacy Library edition, 2014. ISBN 978-0-691-63797-6

== See also ==
- Modernist literature
- Modernist poetry
