= Critical approaches to Hamlet =

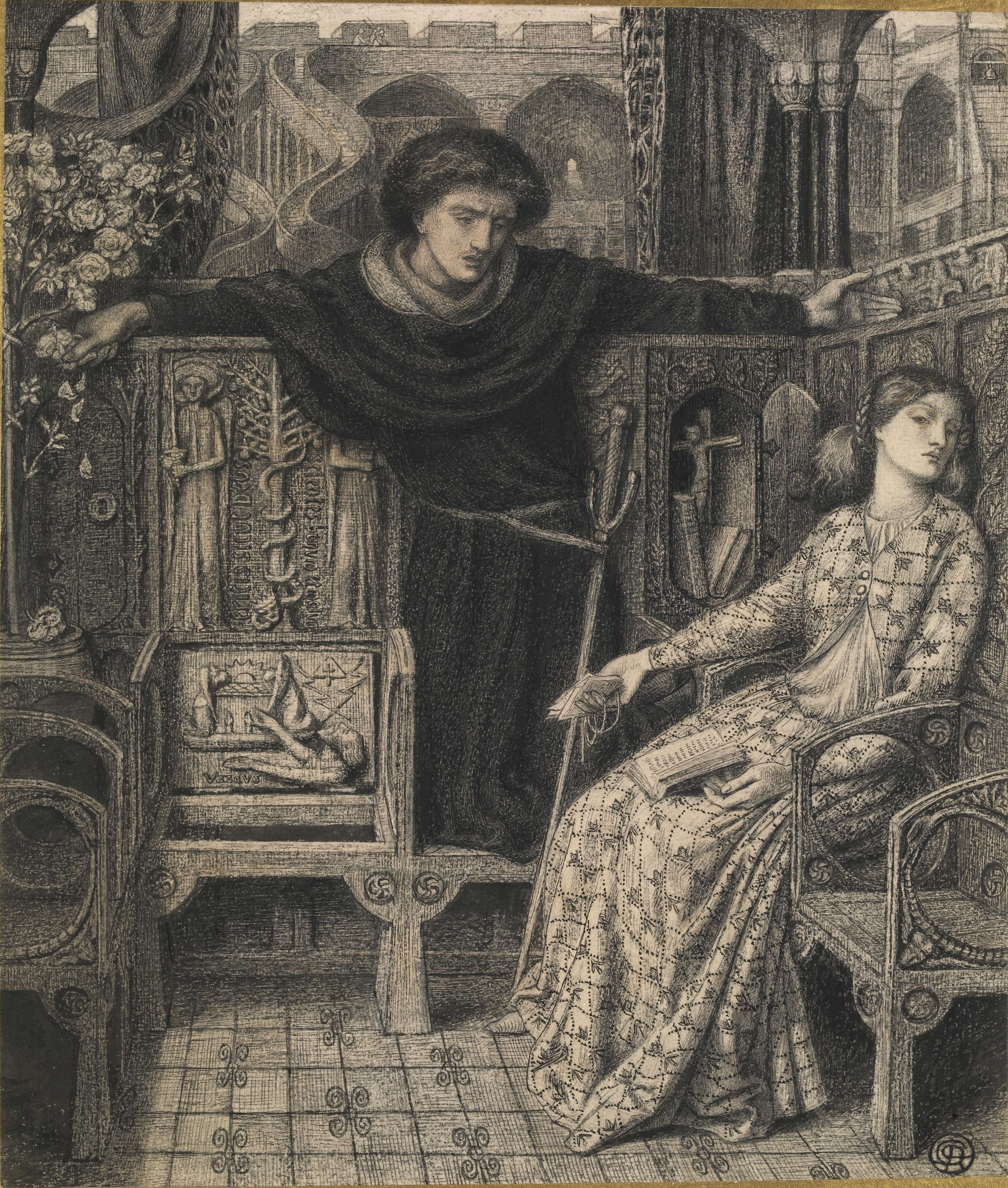
Hamlet and Ophelia, by Dante Gabriel Rossetti

From its premiere at the turn of the 17th century, Hamlet has remained Shakespeare's best-known, most imitated, and most analyzed play. The character of Hamlet played a critical role in Sigmund Freud's explanation of the Oedipus complex. Even within the narrower field of literature, the play's influence has been strong. As Foakes writes, "No other character's name in Shakespeare's plays, and few in literature, have come to embody an attitude to life ... and been converted into a noun in this way."

== History ==
=== Renaissance period ===
Interpretations of Hamlet in Shakespeare's day were very concerned with the play's portrayal of madness. The play was also often portrayed more violently than in later times. The play's contemporary popularity is suggested both by the five quartos that appeared in Shakespeare's lifetime and by frequent contemporary references (though at least some of these could be to the so-called Ur-Hamlet). These allusions suggest that by the early Jacobean period the play was famous for the ghost and for its dramatization of melancholy and insanity. The procession of mad courtiers and ladies in Jacobean and Caroline drama frequently appears indebted to Hamlet. Other aspects of the play were also remembered. Looking back on Renaissance drama in 1655, Abraham Wright lauds the humor of the gravediggers' scene, although he suggests that Shakespeare was outdone by Thomas Randolph, whose farcical comedy The Jealous Lovers features both a travesty of Ophelia and a graveyard scene. There is some scholarly speculation that Hamlet may have been censored during this period: see Contexts: Religious below. Theatres were closed under the Puritan Commonwealth, which ran from 1640 to 1660.

=== Restoration ===
When the monarchy was restored in 1660, theatres re-opened. Early interpretations of the play, from the late 17th to early 18th century, typically showed Prince Hamlet as a heroic figure. Critics responded to Hamlet in terms of the same dichotomy that shaped all responses to Shakespeare during the period. On the one hand, Shakespeare was seen as primitive and untutored, both in comparison to later English dramatists such as Fletcher and especially when measured against the neoclassical ideals of art brought back from France with the Restoration. On the other, Shakespeare remained popular not just with mass audiences but even with the very critics made uncomfortable by his ignorance of Aristotle's unities and decorum.

Thus, critics considered Hamlet in a milieu which abundantly demonstrated the play's dramatic viability. John Evelyn saw the play in 1661, and in his Diary he deplored the play's violation of the unities of time and place. Yet by the end of the period, John Downes noted that Hamlet was staged more frequently and profitably than any other play in Betterton's repertory.

In addition to Hamlet's worth as a tragic hero, Restoration critics focused on the qualities of Shakespeare's language and, above all, on the question of tragic decorum. Critics disparaged the indecorous range of Shakespeare's language, with Polonius's fondness for puns and Hamlet's use of "mean" (i.e., low) expressions such as "there's the rub" receiving particular attention. Even more important was the question of decorum, which in the case of Hamlet focused on the play's violation of tragic unity of time and place, and on the characters. Jeremy Collier attacked the play on both counts in his Short View of the Immorality and Profaneness of the English Stage, published in 1698. Comparing Ophelia to Electra, he condemns Shakespeare for allowing his heroine to become "immodest" in her insanity, particularly in the "Flower Scene". (Note: The "Flower Scene" is in Hamlet 4.5.151–92.)

Collier's attack occasioned a widespread, often vituperative controversy. Hamlet in general and Ophelia in particular were defended by Thomas D'urfey and George Drake almost immediately. Drake defends the play's justice on the grounds that the murderers are "caught in their own toils" (that is, traps). He also defends Ophelia by describing her actions in the context of her desperate situation; D'urfey, by contrast, simply claims that Dennis has discerned immorality in places to which no one else objected. In the next decade, Rowe and Dennis agreed with Collier that the play violated justice; Shaftesbury and others defended the play as ultimately moral.

=== Early eighteenth century ===
Criticism of the play in the first decades of the 18th century continued to be dominated by the neoclassical conception of plot and character. Even the many critics who defended Hamlet took for granted the necessity of the classical canon in principle. Voltaire's attack on the play is perhaps the most famous neoclassical treatment of the play; it inspired numerous defenses in England, but these defenses did not at first weaken the neoclassical orthodoxy. Thus Lewis Theobald explained the seeming absurdity of Hamlet's calling death an "undiscovered country" not long after he has encountered the Ghost by hypothesizing that the Ghost describes Purgatory, not death. Thus William Popple (in 1735) praises the verisimilitude of Polonius's character, deploring the actors' tradition of playing him only as a fool. Both Joseph Addison and Richard Steele praised particular scenes: Steele the psychological insight of the first soliloquy, and Addison the ghost scene.

The ghost scenes, indeed, were particular favorites of an age on the verge of the Gothic revival. Early in the century, George Stubbes noted Shakespeare's use of Horatio's incredulity to make the Ghost credible. At midcentury, Arthur Murphy described the play as a sort of poetic representation of the mind of a "weak and melancholy person." Slightly later, George Colman the Elder singled out the play in a general discussion of Shakespeare's skill with supernatural elements in drama.

In 1735, Aaron Hill sounded an unusual but prescient note when he praised the seeming contradictions in Hamlet's temperament (rather than condemning them as violations of decorum). After midcentury, such psychological readings had begun to gain more currency. Tobias Smollett criticized what he saw as the illogic of the "to be or not to be" soliloquy, which was belied, he said, by Hamlet's actions. More commonly, the play's disparate elements were defended as part of a grander design. Horace Walpole, for instance, defends the mixture of comedy and tragedy as ultimately more realistic and effective than rigid separation would be. Samuel Johnson echoed Popple in defending the character of Polonius; Johnson also doubted the necessity of Hamlet's vicious treatment of Ophelia, and he also viewed skeptically the necessity and probability of the climax. Hamlet's character was also attacked by other critics near the end of the century, among them George Steevens. However, even before the Romantic period, Hamlet was (with Falstaff), the first Shakespearean character to be understood as a personality separate from the play in which he appears.

Not until the late 18th century did critics and performers begin to view the play as confusing or inconsistent, with Hamlet falling from such high status. Goethe had one of his characters say, in his 1795 novel Wilhelm Meister's Apprenticeship, "Shakespeare meant...to represent the effects of a great action laid upon a soul unfit for the performance of it...A lovely, pure, noble, and most moral nature, without the strength of nerve which forms a hero, sinks beneath a burden which it cannot bear, and must not cast away." This change in the view of Hamlet's character is sometimes seen as a shift in the critical emphasis on plot (characteristic of the period before 1750) to an emphasis on the theatrical portrayal of the character (after 1750).

=== Romantic criticism ===
Already before the Romantic period proper, critics had begun to stress the elements of the play that would cause Hamlet to be seen, in the next century, as the epitome of the tragedy of character. In 1774, William Richardson sounded the key notes of this analysis: Hamlet was a sensitive and accomplished prince with an unusually refined moral sense; he is nearly incapacitated by the horror of the truth about his mother and uncle, and he struggles against that horror to fulfill his task. Richardson, who thought the play should have ended shortly after the closet scene, thus saw the play as dramatizing the conflict between a sensitive individual and a calloused, seamy world.

Henry Mackenzie notes the tradition of seeing Hamlet as the most varied of Shakespeare's creations: "With the strongest purposes of revenge he is irresolute and inactive; amidst the gloom of the deepest melancholy he is gay and jocular; and while he is described as a passionate lover he seems indifferent about the object of his affections." Like Richardson, Mackenzie concludes that the tragedy in the play arises from Hamlet's nature: even the best qualities of his character merely reinforce his inability to cope with the world in which he is placed. To this analysis Thomas Robertson adds in particular the devastating impact of the death of Hamlet's father.

By the end of the 18th century, psychological and textual criticism had outrun strictly rhetorical criticism; one still sees occasional critiques of metaphors viewed as inappropriate or barbarous, but by and large the neoclassical critique of Shakespeare's language had become moribund. The most extended critique of the play's language from the end of the century is perhaps that of Hugh Blair.

Another change occurred right around the Romantic literary period (19th century), known for its emphasis on the individual and internal motive. The Romantic period viewed Hamlet as more of a rebel against politics, and as an intellectual, rather than an overly-sensitive, being. This is also the period when the question of Hamlet's delay is brought up, as previously it could be seen as plot device, while romantics focused largely on character. Samuel Coleridge, for example, delivered lectures on Hamlet during this period that evaluated his tragic state of mind in an interpretation that proved influential for over a century. For Coleridge, Shakespeare depicted Hamlet's light of indecisiveness as resulting from an imbalance between the human attention to external objects, and inward thoughts, and thus suffered a paralysis of action because his faculty of vivid imagination overpowered his will and induced an aversion to actually enacting any measure. He felt that Shakespeare aimed to convey the basic message that man must act, and not be trammeled by excessive thinking that only leads to delay. Later criticism has come to consider this view as much a reflection of Coleridge's own problematical nature as an insight into the Shakespearean character. Coleridge and other writers praised the play for its philosophical questions, which guided the audience to ponder and grow intellectually.

=== Late nineteenth to early twentieth centuries ===
At around the turn of the 20th century, two writers, A. C. Bradley and Sigmund Freud, developed ideas which built on the past and greatly affected the future of Hamlet criticism. Bradley held the view that Hamlet should be studied as one would study a real person: piecing together his consciousness from the clues given in the play. His explanation of Hamlet's delay was one of a deep "melancholy" which grew from a growing disappointment in his mother. Freud also viewed Hamlet as a real person: one whose psyche could be analyzed through the text. He took the view that Hamlet's madness merely disguised the truth in the same way dreams disguise unconscious realities. He also famously saw Hamlet's struggles as a representation of the Oedipus complex. In Freud's view, Hamlet is torn largely because he has repressed sexual desire for his mother, which is being acted out by and challenged by Claudius.

=== Mid- and late-twentieth century ===
Later critics of the century, such as T. S. Eliot in his noted essay "Hamlet and His Problems", downplayed such psychological emphasis of the play, and instead used other methods to read characters in the play, focusing on minor characters such as Gertrude, and seeing what they reveal about Hamlet's decisions. Eliot famously called Hamlet "an artistic failure", and criticized the play as analogous to the Mona Lisa, in that both were overly enigmatic. Eliot targeted Hamlet's disgust with his mother as lacking an "objective correlative"; viz., his feelings were excessive in the context of the play.

Questions about Gertrude and other minor characters were later taken underwing by the feminist criticism movement, as criticism focused more and more on questions of gender and political import. Current, New Historicist theories now attempt to remove the romanticism surrounding the play and show its context in the world of Elizabethan England.

=== Twenty-first century ===
The scholar Margreta de Grazia, finding that much of Hamlet scholarship focused on the psychological, dedicated her work Hamlet without Hamlet to understand the political in the play. The scholar Linda Charnes (author of Hamlet's Heirs: Shakespeare and the Politics of a New Millennium) echoed this notion in her review of de Grazia's book: "There is no figure in Shakespeare's canon more explored, expounded upon, analyzed, psychoanalyzed, deconstructed, reconstructed, appropriated, situated, and expropriated than Hamlet, Prince of Denmark." De Grazia points out that many words in the play have multiple meanings and that some of these meanings are political through their overt concern with land.

== Analysis and criticism ==
=== Dramatic structure ===
In creating Hamlet, Shakespeare broke several rules, one of the largest being the rule of action over character. In his day, plays were usually expected to follow the advice of Aristotle in his Poetics, which declared that a drama should not focus on the character so much as action. The highlights of Hamlet, however, are not the action scenes, but the soliloquies, wherein Hamlet reveals his motives and thoughts to the audience. Also, unlike Shakespeare's other plays, there is no strong subplot; all plot forks are directly connected to the main vein of Hamlet's struggle to gain revenge. The play is full of seeming discontinuities and irregularities of action. At one point, Hamlet is resolved to kill Claudius: in the next scene, he is suddenly tame. Scholars still debate whether these odd plot turns are mistakes or intentional additions to add to the play's theme of confusion and duality.

=== Language ===
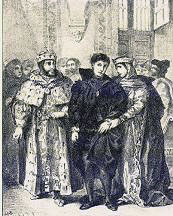
Hamlet's statement in this scene that his dark clothing is merely an outward representation of his inward grief is an example of his strong rhetorical skill.

Much of the play's language embodies the elaborate, witty vocabulary expected of a royal court. This is in line with Baldassare Castiglione's work, The Courtier (published in 1528), which outlines several courtly rules, specifically advising servants of royals to amuse their rulers with their inventive diction. Osric and Polonius seem to especially respect this suggestion. Claudius' speech is full of rhetorical figures, as is Hamlet's and, at times, Ophelia's, while Horatio, the guards, and the gravediggers use simpler methods of speech. Claudius demonstrates an authoritative control over the language of a King, referring to himself in the first person plural, and using anaphora mixed with metaphor that hearkens back to Greek political speeches. Hamlet seems the most educated in the rhetoric of all the characters, using anaphora, as the king does, but also asyndeton and highly developed metaphors, while at the same time managing to be precise and unflowery (as when he explains his inward emotion to his mother, saying "But I have that within which passes show, / These but the trappings and the suits of woe."). His language is very self-conscious and relies heavily on puns. Especially when pretending to be mad, Hamlet uses puns to reveal his true thoughts, while at the same time hiding them. Psychologists have since associated a heavy use of puns with schizophrenia.

Hendiadys is one rhetorical type found in several places in the play, as in Ophelia's speech after the nunnery scene ("The expectancy and rose of the fair state" and "I, of all ladies, most deject and wretched" are two examples). Many scholars have found it odd that Shakespeare would, seemingly arbitrarily, use this rhetorical form throughout the play. Hamlet was written later in his life, when he was better at matching rhetorical figures with the characters and the plot than early in his career. Wright, however, has proposed that hendiadys is used to heighten the sense of duality in the play.

Hamlet's soliloquies have captured the attention of scholars as well. Early critics viewed such speeches as To be, or not to be as Shakespeare's expressions of his own personal beliefs. Later scholars, such as Charney, have rejected this theory saying the soliloquies are expressions of Hamlet's thought process. During his speeches, Hamlet interrupts himself, expressing disgust in agreement with himself, and embellishing his own words. He has difficulty expressing himself directly and instead skirts around the basic idea of his thought. Not until late in the play, after his experience with the pirates, is Hamlet really able to be direct and sure in his speech.

=== Contexts ===
==== Religious ====
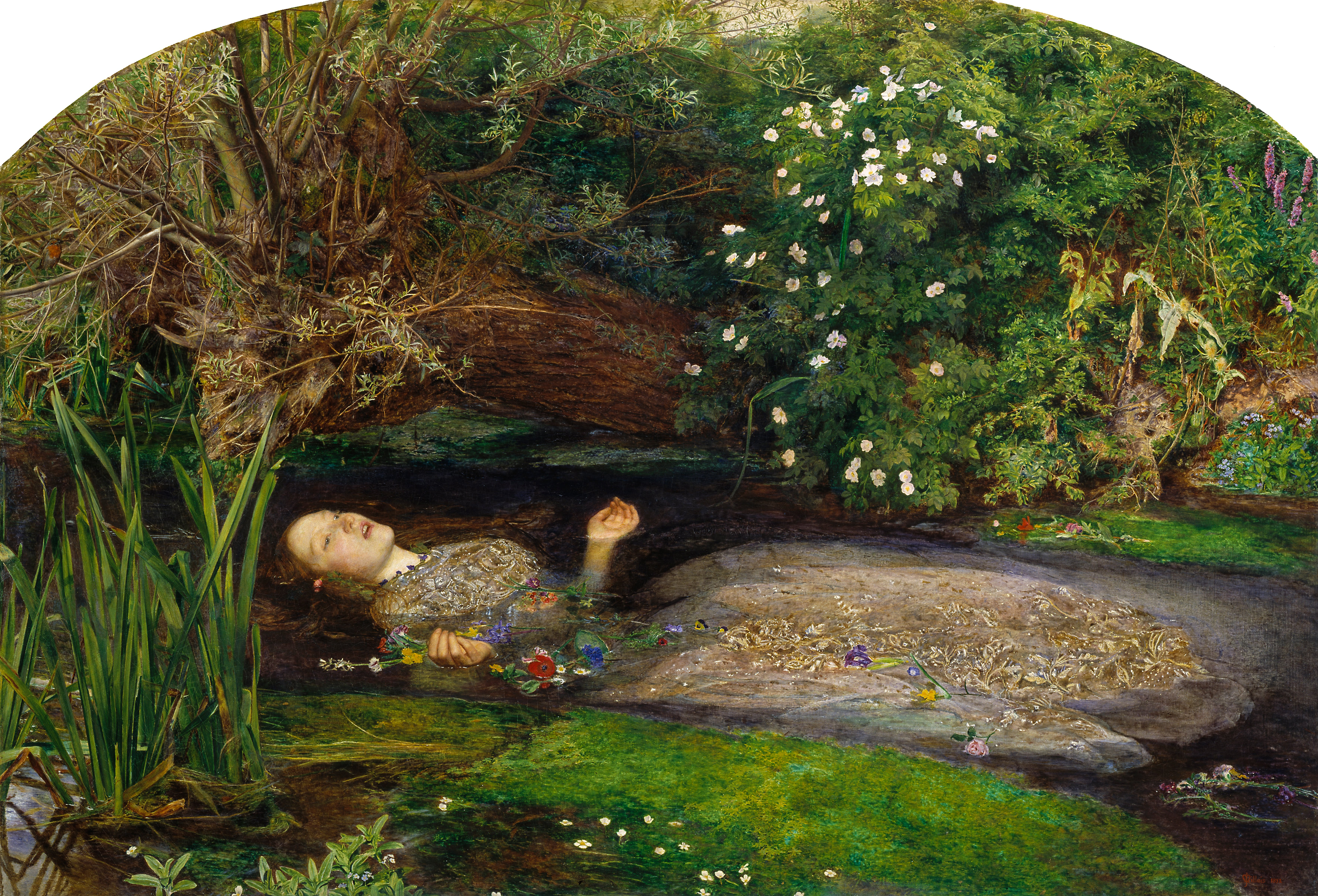
John Everett Millais' Ophelia (1852) depicts Ophelia's mysterious death by drowning. The clowns' discussion of whether her death was a suicide and whether she merits a Christian burial is, at heart, a religious topic.

The play makes several references to both Catholicism and Protestantism, the two most powerful theological forces of the time in Europe. The Ghost describes himself as being in purgatory, and as having died without receiving his last rites. This, along with Ophelia's burial ceremony, which is uniquely Catholic, make up most of the play's Catholic connections. Some scholars have pointed that revenge tragedies were traditionally Catholic, possibly because of their sources: Spain and Italy, both Catholic nations. Scholars have pointed out that knowledge of the play's Catholicism can reveal important paradoxes in Hamlet's decision process. According to Catholic doctrine, the strongest duty is to God and family. Hamlet's father being killed and calling for revenge thus offers a contradiction: does he avenge his father and kill Claudius, or does he leave the vengeance to God, as his religion requires? (Note: In the New Testament, see Romans 12:19: "'vengeance is mine, I will repay' sayeth the Lord".)

The play's Protestantism lies in its location in Denmark, a Protestant (and specifically a Lutheran) country in Shakespeare's day, though it is unclear whether the fictional Denmark of the play is intended to mirror this fact. The play does mention Wittenberg, which is where Hamlet is attending university, and where Martin Luther first nailed his 95 Theses. One of the more famous lines in the play related to Protestantism is: "There is special providence in the fall of a sparrow. If it be not now, 'tis not to come; if it be not to come, it will be now; if it be not now, yet will it come—the readiness is all."

In the First Quarto, the same line reads: "There's a predestinate providence in the fall of a sparrow." Scholars have wondered whether Shakespeare was censored, as the word "predestined" appears in this one quarto of Hamlet, but not in others, and as censoring of plays was far from unusual at the time. Rulers and religious leaders feared that the doctrine of predestination would lead people to excuse the most traitorous of actions, with the excuse, "God made me do it." English Puritans, for example, believed that conscience was a more powerful force than the law, due to the new ideas at the time that conscience came not from religious or government leaders, but from God directly to the individual. Many leaders at the time condemned the doctrine, as: "unfit 'to keepe subjects in obedience to their sovereigns" as people might "openly maintained that God hath as well pre-designated men to be traitors as to be kings." King James, as well, often wrote about his dislike of Protestant leaders' taste for standing up to kings, seeing it as a dangerous trouble to society. Throughout the play, Shakespeare mixes the two religions, making interpretation difficult. At one moment, the play is Catholic and medieval, in the next, it is logical and Protestant. Scholars continue to debate what part religion and religious contexts play in Hamlet.

==== Philosophical ====
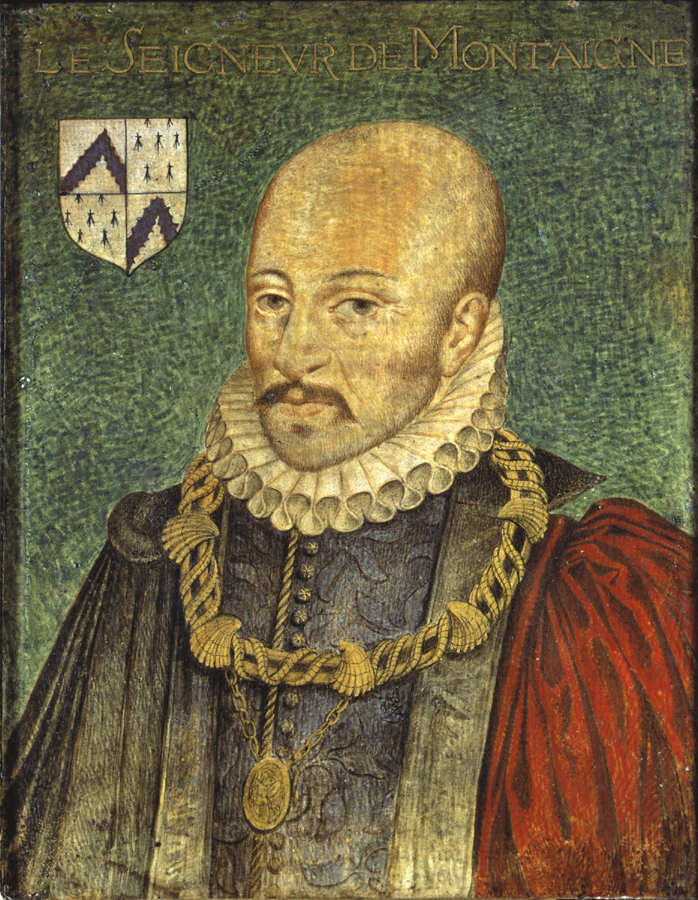
Philosophical ideas in Hamlet are similar to those of Michel de Montaigne, a contemporary to Shakespeare.

Hamlet is often perceived as a philosophical character. Some of the most prominent philosophical theories in Hamlet are relativism, existentialism, and scepticism. Hamlet expresses a relativist idea when he says to Rosencrantz: "there is nothing either good or bad but thinking makes it so" (2.2.268-270). The idea that nothing is real except in the mind of the individual finds its roots in the Greek Sophists, who argued that since nothing can be perceived except through the senses, and all men felt and sensed things differently, truth was entirely relative. There was no absolute truth. This same line of Hamlet also introduces theories of existentialism. A double-meaning can be read into the word "is", which introduces the question of whether anything "is" or can be if thinking doesn't make it so. This is tied into his To be, or not to be speech, where "to be" can be read as a question of existence. Hamlet's contemplation on suicide in this scene, however, is more religious than philosophical. He believes that he will continue to exist after death.

Hamlet is perhaps most affected by the prevailing skepticism in Shakespeare's day in response to the Renaissance's humanism. Humanists living prior to Shakespeare's time had argued that man was godlike, capable of anything. Skepticism toward this attitude is clearly expressed in Hamlet's What a piece of work is a man speech:

... this goodly frame the earth seems to me a sterile promontory, this most excellent canopy the air, look you, this brave o'erhanging firmament, this majestical roof fretted with golden fire, why it appeareth nothing to me but a foul and pestilent congregation of vapours. What a piece of work is a man—how noble in reason; how infinite in faculties, in form and moving; how express and admirable in action; how like an angel in apprehension; how like a god; the beauty of the world; the paragon of animals. And yet, to me, what is this quintessence of dust? (Note: The "What a piece of work is a man speech" is in Hamlet 2.2.264–74.)

Scholars have pointed out this section's similarities to lines written by Michel de Montaigne in his Essais:

Who have persuaded [man] that this admirable moving of heavens vaults, that the eternal light of these lampes so fiercely rowling over his head, that the horror-moving and continuall motion of this infinite vaste ocean were established, and continue so many ages for his commoditie and service? Is it possible to imagine so ridiculous as this miserable and wretched creature, which is not so much as master of himselfe, exposed and subject to offences of all things, and yet dareth call himself Master and Emperor.

Rather than being a direct influence on Shakespeare, however, Montaigne may have been reacting to the same general atmosphere of the time, making the source of these lines one of context rather than direct influence.

== Common subjects of criticism ==
=== Revenge and Hamlet's delay ===
Within Hamlet, the stories of five murdered fathers' sons are told: Hamlet, Laertes, Fortinbras, Pyrrhus, and Brutus. Each of them faces the question of revenge in a different way. For example, Laertes moves quickly to be "avenged most throughly of [his] father", while Fortinbras attacks Poland, rather than the guilty Denmark. Pyrrhus only stays his hand momentarily before avenging his father, Achilles, but Brutus never takes any action in his situation. Hamlet is a perfect balance in the midst of these stories, neither acting quickly nor being completely inactive.

Hamlet struggles to turn his desire for revenge into action, and spends a large portion of the play waiting rather than doing. Scholars have proposed numerous theories as to why he waits so long to kill Claudius. Some say that Hamlet feels for his victim, fearing to strike because he believes that if he kills Claudius he will be no better than him. The story of Pyrrhus, told by one of the acting troupe, for example, shows Hamlet the darker side of revenge, something he does not wish for. Hamlet frequently admires those who are swift to act, such as Laertes, who comes to avenge his father's death, but at the same time fears them for their passion, intensity, and lack of logical thought.

Hamlet's speech in Act III, where he chooses not to kill Claudius in the midst of prayer, has taken a central spot in this debate. Scholars have wondered whether Hamlet is being totally honest in this scene, or whether he is rationalizing his inaction to himself. Critics of the Romantic era decided that Hamlet was merely a procrastinator, in order to avoid the belief that he truly desired Claudius' spiritual demise. Later scholars suggested that he refused to kill an unarmed man, or that he felt guilt in this moment, seeing himself as a mirror of the man he wanted to destroy. Indeed, it seems Hamlet's Renaissance-driven principles serve to procrastinate his thoughts. The physical image of Hamlet stabbing to death an unarmed man at prayer, from behind, would have been shocking to any theater audience. Similarly, the question of "delay" must be seen in the context of a stage play—Hamlet's "delay" between learning of the murder and avenging it would be about three hours at most—hardly a delay at all.

The play is also full of constraint imagery. Hamlet describes Denmark as a prison, and himself as being caught in birdlime. He mocks the ability of man to bring about his own ends, and points out that some divine force molds men's aims into something other than what they intend. Other characters also speak of constraint, such as Polonius, who orders his daughter to lock herself from Hamlet's pursuit, and describes her as being tethered. This adds to the play's description of Hamlet's inability to act out his revenge.

David P. Gontar in his book Hamlet Made Simple proposes that Hamlet's delay is best explained by conceiving of Prince Hamlet as the son of Claudius, not Hamlet the Dane. Noting that Hamlet is suicidal in the first soliloquy well before he meets the Ghost, Gontar reasons that his depression is a result of having been passed over for the Danish throne which is given inexplicably to the King's brother. This tends to imply an impediment to succession, namely illegitimacy. On this reading some collateral issues are resolved: Hamlet is angry at his mother for an extramarital affair she had with Claudius, of which he, the Prince, is a byproduct. Further, the reason Hamlet cannot kill the King is not because the King is a father figure but, more strongly, because he is Hamlet's actual biological father. We can deduce, then, that the Ghost is in fact a liar, who shows no concern for Hamlet's own personal welfare. He confirms the fatherhood of King Hamlet in order to give Hamlet an incentive for revenge.

=== Madness ===
Hamlet has been compared to the Earl of Essex, who was executed for leading a rebellion against Queen Elizabeth. Essex's situation has been analyzed by scholars for its revelations into Elizabethan ideas of madness in connection with treason as they connect with Hamlet. Essex was largely seen as out of his mind by Elizabethans, and admitted to insanity on the scaffold before his death. Seen in the same context, Hamlet is quite possibly as mad as he is pretending to be, at least in an Elizabethan sense.

=== Protestantism ===
Hamlet was a student at Wittenberg or so is thought. Wittenberg is "one of only two universities that Shakespeare ever mentions by name", and "was famous in the early sixteenth century for its teaching of ... Luther's new doctrine of salvation". Furthermore, Hamlet's reference to "a politic convocation of worms" has been read as a cryptic allusion to Luther's famous theological confrontation with the Holy Roman Emperor at the Diet of Worms in 1521.

However, the more influential Reformer in early 17th century England was John Calvin, a strong advocate of predestination; many critics have found traces of Calvin's predestinarian theology in Shakespeare's play. Calvin explained the doctrine of predestination by comparing it to a stage, or a theater, in which the script is written for the characters by God, and they cannot deviate from it. God, in this light, sets up a script and a stage for each of his creations, and decrees the end from the beginning, as Calvin said: "After the world had been created, man was placed in it, as in a theater, that he, beholding above him and beneath the wonderful work of God, might reverently adore their Author." Scholars have made comparisons between this explanation of Calvin's and the frequent references made to the theatre in Hamlet, suggesting that these may also take reference to the doctrine of predestination, as the play must always end in its tragic way, according to the script.

Rulers and religious leaders feared that the doctrine of predestination would lead people to excuse the most traitorous of actions, with the excuse, "God made me do it." English Puritans, for example, believed that conscience was a more powerful force than the law, due to the new ideas at the time that conscience came not from religious or government leaders, but from God directly to the individual. Many leaders at the time condemned the doctrine, as: "unfit 'to keepe subjects in obedience to their sovereigns" as people might "openly maintayne that God hath as well pre-destinated men to be trayters as to be kings". King James, as well, often wrote about his dislike of Protestant leaders' taste for standing up to kings, seeing it as a dangerous trouble to society.

In Hamlet's final decision to join the sword-game of Laertes, and thus enter his tragic final scene, he says to the fearful Horatio:

"There is special providence in the fall of a sparrow. If it be now, 'tis not to come; if it be not to come, it will be now; if it be not now, yet will it come—the readiness is all. Since no man, of aught he leaves, knows what is't to leave betimes, let be."

In itself, this line lays the final capstone on Hamlet's decision. The line appears to base this decision on his believed predestination as the killer of the king, no matter what he may do. The potential allusion to predestinarian theology is even stronger in the first published version of Hamlet, Quarto 1, where this same line reads: "There's a predestinate providence in the fall of a sparrow." Scholars have wondered whether Shakespeare was censored, as the word "predestined" appears in this one Quarto of Hamlet, but not in others, and as censoring of plays was far from unusual at the time.

=== Catholicism ===
At the same time, Hamlet expresses several Catholic views. The Ghost, for example, describes himself as being slain without receiving Extreme Unction, his last rites. He also implies that he has been living in Purgatory: "I am thy father's spirit / Doom'd for a certain term to walk the night, / And for the day confin'd to fast in fires, / Till the foul crimes done in my days of nature / Are burnt and purg'd away" (1.5.9-13). While belief in Purgatory remains part of Roman Catholic teaching today, it was explicitly rejected by the Protestant Reformers in the 16th century. (Note: On the larger significance of Purgatory in the play (and in post-Reformation England), see Stephen Greenblatt's Hamlet in Purgatory. See also John Freeman's "This Side of Purgatory: Ghostly Fathers and the Recusant Legacy in Hamlet".)

Catholic doctrines manifest themselves all over the play, including the discussion over the manner of Ophelia's burial in Act 5. The question in this scene is of whether it is right for Ophelia to have a Christian burial, since those who commit suicide are guilty of their own murder in the doctrines of the church. As the debate continues between the two clowns, it becomes a question of whether her drowning was suicide or not. Shakespeare never fully answers this question, but presents both sides: either that she did not act to stop the drowning and therefore committed suicide of her own will, or that she was mad and did not know the danger and thus was killed by the water, innocently.

The burial of Ophelia reveals more of the religious doctrines in question through the Priest overseeing the funeral. Scholars have carefully outlined the "maimed rites" (as Hamlet calls them) carried out by the Priest. Many things are missing in her funeral that would normally make up a Christian burial. Laertes asks, "What ceremony else?" The priest answers that since her death was questionable, they will not give her the full funeral, although they will allow her "maiden strewments", or flowers which were thrown into her grave. In cases of suicide, sharp rocks, rather than flowers, were thrown in. The difficulties in this deeply religious moment reflect much of the religious debate of the time.

=== Other interpretations ===
==== Feminist ====
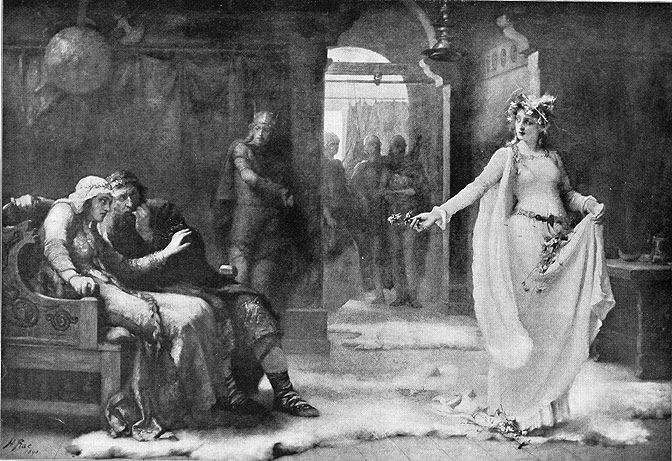
Ophelia, distracted by grief (4.5). Feminist critics have explored her descent into madness in her defense.

Feminist critics have focused on the gender system of Early Modern England. For example, they point to the common classification of women as maid, wife or widow, with only whores outside this trilogy. Using this analysis, the problem of Hamlet becomes the central character's identification of his mother as a whore due to her failure to remain faithful to Old Hamlet, in consequence of which he loses his faith in all women, treating Ophelia as if she were a whore also.

Carolyn Heilbrun published an essay on Hamlet in 1957 entitled "Hamlet's Mother". In it, she defended Gertrude, arguing that the text never hints that Gertrude knew of Claudius poisoning King Hamlet. This view has been championed by many feminists. Heilbrun argued that the men who had interpreted the play over the centuries had completely misinterpreted Gertrude, believing what Hamlet said about her rather than the actual text of the play. In this view, no clear evidence suggests that Gertrude was an adulteress. She was merely adapting to the circumstances of her husband's death for the good of the kingdom.

Ophelia, also, has been defended by feminists, most notably by Elaine Showalter. Ophelia is surrounded by powerful men: her father, brother, and Hamlet. All three disappear: Laertes leaves, Hamlet abandons her, and Polonius dies. Conventional theories had argued that without these three powerful men making decisions for her, Ophelia was driven into madness. Feminist theorists argue that she goes mad with guilt because, when Hamlet kills her father, he has fulfilled her sexual desire to have Hamlet kill her father so they can be together. Showalter points out that Ophelia has become the symbol of the distraught and hysterical woman in modern culture, a symbol which may not be entirely accurate nor healthy for women.

==== Psychoanalytic ====
Key figures in psychoanalysis—Sigmund Freud and Jacques Lacan—have offered interpretations of Hamlet. In his The Interpretation of Dreams (1899), Freud proceeds from his recognition of what he perceives to be a fundamental contradiction in the text: "the play is built up on Hamlet's hesitations over fulfilling the task of revenge that is assigned to him; but its text offers no reasons or motives for these hesitations". He considers Goethe's 'paralysis from over-intellectualization' explanation as well as the idea that Hamlet is a "pathologically irresolute character". He rejects both, citing the evidence that the play presents of Hamlet's ability to take action: his impulsive murder of Polonius and his Machiavellian murder of Rosencrantz and Guildenstern. Instead, Freud argues, Hamlet's inhibition against taking vengeance on Claudius has an unconscious origin.

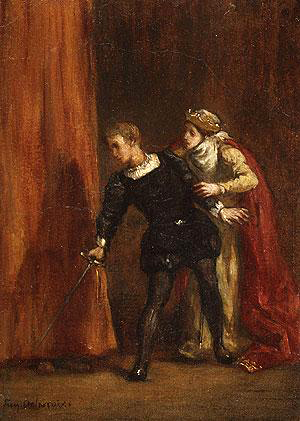
Freud's theory of Hamlet's unconscious oedipal desire towards his mother has influenced modern performances of the 'closet scene' (3.3).

In an anticipation of his later theories of the Oedipus complex, Freud suggests that Claudius has shown Hamlet "the repressed wishes of his own childhood realized" (his desire to kill his father and take his father's place with his mother). Confronted with this image of his own repressed desires, Hamlet responds with "self-reproaches" and "scruples of conscience, which remind him that he himself is literally no better than the sinner whom he is to punish". Freud goes on to suggest that Hamlet's apparent "distaste for sexuality", as expressed in his conversation with Ophelia (presumably in the 'nunnery scene' rather than during the play-within-a-play), "fits in well" with this interpretation.

Since this theory, the 'closet scene' in which Hamlet confronts his mother in her private quarters has been portrayed in a sexual light in several performances. Hamlet is played as scolding his mother for having sex with Claudius while simultaneously wishing (unconsciously) that he could take Claudius' place; adultery and incest is what he simultaneously loves and hates about his mother. Ophelia's madness after her father's death may be read through the Freudian lens as a reaction to the death of her hoped-for lover, her father. Her unrequited love for him suddenly slain is too much for her and she drifts into insanity.

In addition to the brief psychoanalysis of Hamlet, Freud offers a correlation with Shakespeare's own life: Hamlet was written in the wake of the death of his father (in 1601), which revived his own repressed childhood wishes; Freud also points to the identity of Shakespeare's dead son Hamnet and the name 'Hamlet'. "Just as Hamlet deals with the relation of a son to his parents", Freud concludes, "so Macbeth (written at approximately the same period) is concerned with the subject of childlessness". Having made these suggestions, however, Freud offers a caveat: he has unpacked only one of the many motives and impulses operating in the author's mind, albeit, Freud claims, one that operates from "the deepest layer".

Later in the same book, having used psychoanalysis to explain Hamlet, Freud uses Hamlet to explain the nature of dreams: in disguising himself as a madman and adopting the license of the fool, Hamlet "was behaving just as dreams do in reality ... concealing the true circumstances under a cloak of wit and unintelligibility". When we sleep, each of us adopts an "antic disposition".

==== Gothic ====
Hamlet contains many elements that would later show up in Gothic literature. From the growing madness of Prince Hamlet, to the violent ending to the constant reminders of death, to, even, more subtly, the notions of humankind and its structures and the viewpoints on women, Hamlet evokes many things that would recur in what is widely regarded as the first piece of Gothic literature, Horace Walpole's The Castle of Otranto, and in other Gothic works. (Note: See, for example, Margreta de Grazia's "When did Hamlet Become Modern?") Walpole himself even wrote, in his second preference to Otranto:

That great master of nature, Shakespeare, was the model I copied. Let me ask if his tragedies of Hamlet and Julius Cæsar would not lose a considerable share of their spirit and wonderful beauties, if the humour of the grave- diggers, the fooleries of Polonius, and the clumsy jests of the Roman citizens, were omitted, or vested in heroics?

=== Heroic ===
Paul Cantor, in his short text called simply Hamlet, formulates a theory of the play that places the prince at the center of the Renaissance conflict between Ancient and Christian notions of heroism. Cantor says that the Renaissance signified a "rebirth of classical antiquity within a Christian culture". But such a rebirth brought with it a deep contradiction: Christ's teachings of humility and meekness ("whoever shall smite thee on thy right cheek, turn to him the other also") are in direct conflict with the ancient ethos that is best represented by Achilles' violent action in the Iliad ("I wish only that my spirit and fury would drive me to hack your meat away and eat it raw for the things that you have done to me").

For Cantor, the character of Hamlet exists exactly where these two worlds collide. He is in one sense drawn towards the active side of heroism by his father's legacy ("He smote the sledded Polaks on the ice") and the need for revenge ("now could I drink hot blood. And do such bitter business as the day/ Would quake to look on"). Simultaneously though, he is pulled towards a religious existence ("for in that sleep of death what dreams may come") and in some sense sees his father's return as a ghost as justification for just such a belief.

The conflict is perhaps most evident in 3.3 when Hamlet has the opportunity to kill the praying Claudius. He restrains himself though, justifying his further hesitation with the following lines: "Now might I do it pat, now 'a is a-praying;/ And now I'll do it- and so 'a goes to heaven,/ And so am I reveng'd. That would be scann'd:/ A villain kills my father, and for that/ I, his sole son, do this same villain send/ To heaven.". At this moment it is clear that the prince's single mind and body are being torn apart by these two powerful ideologies.

Even in the famous 3.1 soliloquy, Hamlet gives voice to the conflict. When he asks if it is "nobler in the mind to suffer", Cantor believes that Shakespeare is alluding to the Christian sense of suffering. When he presents the alternative, "to take arms against a sea of troubles", Cantor takes this as an ancient formulation of goodness.

Cantor points out that most interpretations of Hamlet (such as the Psychoanalytic or Existentialist) see "the problem of Hamlet as somehow rooted in his individual soul" whereas Cantor himself believes that his Heroic theory mirrors "a more fundamental tension in the Renaissance culture in which he lives".

=== Meta-interpretational ===
Maynard Mack, in a hugely influential chapter of Everybody's Shakespeare entitled "The Readiness is All", claims that the problematic aspects of Hamlet's plot are not accidental (as critics such as T.S. Eliot might have it) but are in fact woven into the very fabric of the play. "It is not simply a matter of missing motivations," he says, "to be expunged if only we could find the perfect clue. It is built in". Mack states that "Hamlet's world is pre-eminently in the interrogative mood. It reverberates with questions". He highlights numerous examples: "What a piece of work is man!... and yet to me what is this quintessence of dust?"; "To be, or not to be—that is the question"; "Get thee to a nunnery. Why wouldst thou be a breeder of sinners?"; "What should such fellows as I do crawling between earth and heaven?". The action of the play, especially the scenes outside the castle, take place in a kind of logical fog. The opening scene is riddled with confusions and distortions: "Bernardo?"; "What, is Horatio there?"; "What, has it appeared again tonight?"; "Is not this something more than fantasy?".

Hamlet himself realizes that "he is the greatest riddle of all" and at 3.2.345 he expresses his frustration with Rosencrantz and Guildenstern: "how unworthy a thing you make of me... call me what instrument you will, though you can fret me, you cannot play upon me". Mack says that the confusion of the drama points "beyond the context of the play, out of Hamlet's predicaments into everyone's".

Other critics such as Martin Evans expand upon Mack's notion of built-in mystery, claiming that even the textual discrepancies between the three known versions may actually be deliberate (or at the very least they add to the effect). Evans also argues that Shakespeare's impenetrable text and Hamlet's 'unplayable' strings could be meant to reflect the deep anxieties that were felt in an era of philosophical, scientific and religious disorientation. The works (and actions) of Machiavelli, Copernicus and Luther had upset hierarchical notions of virtue, order and salvation that had persisted since the Middle Ages.

Hamlet is in a sense the inscrutable and enigmatic world within which human beings had to orient themselves for the first time. We are each characters in a play just like Gertrude, Polonius and the rest—where they are trying to grasp Hamlet, we are trying to grasp Hamlet. Whatever interpretation we walk away with though, whether it be existential, religious or feminist, it will necessarily be incomplete. For Mack, human beings will always remain in an "aspect of bafflement, moving in darkness on a rampart between two worlds".

== Notes and references ==
=== References ===
All references to Hamlet, unless otherwise specified, are taken from the Arden Shakespeare Q2. Under their referencing system, 3.1.55 means act 3, scene 1, line 55. References to the First Quarto and First Folio are marked Hamlet Q1 and Hamlet F1, respectively, and are taken from the Arden Shakespeare Hamlet: the texts of 1603 and 1623. Their referencing system for Q1 has no act breaks, so 7.115 means scene 7, line 115.

== Sources ==
=== Editions of Hamlet ===
- Cantor, Paul A., ed. (1989). Shakespeare: Hamlet. Landmarks of World Literature. Cambridge: Cambridge University Press. ISBN 0-521-84003-1.
- Dowden, Edward, ed. (1899). The Tragedy of Hamlet. The Works of Shakespeare. Indianapolis: Bowen-Merrill. hdl:2027/hvd.hwpnwb. OCLC 894247294. OL 20528559M.
- Furness, Horace Howard, ed. (1905). A New Variorum Edition of Hamlet. Philadelphia: J.B. Lippincott. OCLC 921859510.
- Thompson, Ann; Taylor, Neil, eds. (2006). Hamlet. The Arden Shakespeare, third series. Vol. 1. London: Cengage Learning. ISBN 1-904271-33-2.
- Thompson, Ann; Taylor, Neil, eds. (2006). Hamlet: The Texts of 1603 and 1623. The Arden Shakespeare, third series. Vol. 2. London: Cengage Learning. ISBN 1-904271-80-4.
- Wofford, Susanne L. (1994). "A Critical History of Hamlet". Hamlet: Complete, Authoritative Text with Biographical and Historical Contexts, Critical History, and Essays from Five Contemporary Critical Perspectives. Boston: Bedford Books. pp. 181–207. ISBN 0-312-08986-4.

=== Secondary sources ===
- Addison, Joseph (1897) [1711]. "The Spectator, No. 44, (Friday, April 20)". In Smith, G. Gregory (ed.). The Spectator. Vol. I. London: J.M. Dent & Co. pp. 161–6. hdl:2027/miun.abr4009.0001.001. OCLC 353410.
- Babcock, Robert Witbeck (2013) [1931]. The Genesis of Shakespeare Idolatry, 1766-1799: A Study in English Criticism of the Late Eighteenth Century. Chapel Hill: University of North Carolina Press. ISBN 978-1-4696-0914-0.
- Blits, Jan H. (2001). Deadly Thought: Hamlet and the Human Soul. Langham, Maryland: Lexington Books. ISBN 0-7391-0214-1.
- Bloom, Harold (2003). Hamlet: Poem Unlimited. Edinburgh: Canongate. ISBN 1-84195-461-6.
- Cannon, Charles K. (1971). "'As in a Theater': Hamlet in the Light of Calvin's Doctrine of Predestination". SEL: Studies in English Literature 1500–1900. 11 (2, Elizabethan and Jacobean Drama). Rice University: 203–22. doi:10.2307/450060. eISSN 1522-9270. ISSN 0039-3657. JSTOR 450060.
- de Grazia, Margreta (2003). "When did Hamlet become modern?". Textual Practice. 17 (3). Taylor & Francis: 485–503. doi:10.1080/0950236032000140096. eISSN 1470-1308. ISSN 0950-236X. S2CID 219640533.
- de Grazia, Margreta (2007). Hamlet without Hamlet. Cambridge: Cambridge University Press. ISBN 9780521690362.
- Downes, John (1968) [1708]. Roscius Anglicanus (Reprinted ed.). New York: Benjamin Bloom. ISBN 9780405084645.
- Evans, Martin (30 March 2007). Evans, Martin; McCall, Marsh (eds.). Shakespeare, Hamlet. The Literature of Crisis. Stanford University.
- Foakes, R. A. (1993). Hamlet versus Lear: Cultural Politics and Shakespeare's Art. Cambridge: Cambridge University Press. ISBN 0-521-60705-1.
- Freeman, John (2003). "This Side of Purgatory: Ghostly Fathers and the Recusant Legacy in Hamlet". In Taylor, Dennis; Beauregard, David N. (eds.). Shakespeare and the Culture of Christianity in Early Modern England. Studies in Religion and Literature. New York: Fordham University Press. pp. 222–259. ISBN 9780823222834.
- Freud, Sigmund (1991) [1900]. Richards, Angela (ed.). The Interpretation of Dreams. The Penguin Freud Library. Vol. 4. Translated by Strachey, James. London: Penguin. ISBN 0-14-013794-7.
- Greenblatt, Stephen (2001). Hamlet in Purgatory. Princeton: Princeton University Press. ISBN 0-691-05873-3.
- Howard, Jean E. (2003). "Feminist Criticism". In Wells, Stanley; Orlin, Lena (eds.). Shakespeare: An Oxford Guide. Oxford: Oxford University Press. pp. 411–23. ISBN 0-19-924522-3.
- Jenkins, Harold (1965). "'Hamlet' Then Till Now". In Nicoll, Allardyce (ed.). Shakespeare Then Till Now. Shakespeare Survey. Vol. 18. Cambridge: Cambridge University Press. pp. 34–45. doi:10.1017/CCOL0521064317.004. ISBN 9781139052986.
- Kirsch, Arthur C. (1969). "A Caroline Commentary on the Drama". Modern Philology. 66 (3). The University of Chicago Press: 256–61. doi:10.1086/390087. eISSN 1545-6951. ISSN 0026-8232. JSTOR 436454. S2CID 162049086.
- Kliman, Bernice W. (2005). "Hamlet Productions Starring Beale, Hawke, and Darling From the Perspective of Performance History". In Dutton, Richard; Howard, Jean E. (eds.). A Companion to Shakespeare's Works. Blackwell Companions to Literature and Culture. Vol. I: The Tragedies. Wiley-Blackwell. pp. 134–157. doi:10.1002/9780470996539.ch8. ISBN 978-1-4051-3605-1.
- Knowles, Ronald (1999). "Hamlet and Counter-Humanism". Renaissance Quarterly. 52 (4). Renaissance Society of America: 1046–69. doi:10.2307/2901835. eISSN 1935-0236. ISSN 0034-4338. JSTOR 2901835. S2CID 170767175.
- MacCary, W Thomas (1998). Hamlet: A Guide to the Play. Greenwood Guides to Shakespeare. Westport, Connecticut: Greenwood Press. ISBN 0-313-30082-8.
- Mack, Maynard (1993). Everybody's Shakespeare. Lincoln: University of Nebraska Press. ISBN 0-8032-8214-1.
- Matheson, Mark (1995). "Hamlet and "A Matter Tender and Dangerous"". Shakespeare Quarterly. 46 (4). Folger Shakespeare Library: 383–97. doi:10.2307/2870978. eISSN 1538-3555. ISSN 0037-3222. JSTOR 2870978.
- McCullen, Joseph T. Jr. (1962). "Two Key Speeches by Hamlet". The South Central Bulletin. 22 (4, Studies by Members of S–CMLA). The South Central Modern Language Association: 24–5. doi:10.2307/3188448. ISSN 0038-321X. JSTOR 3188448.
- Morgan, Roberta (1939). "The Philosophic Basis of Coleridge's Hamlet Criticism". ELH. 6 (4): 256–270. doi:10.2307/2871640. JSTOR 2871640.
- Morley, John (1872). Voltaire. London: Chapman and Hall. OCLC 465527204.
- Quinlan, Maurice J. (1954). "Shakespeare and the Catholic Burial Services". Shakespeare Quarterly. 5 (3). Folger Shakespeare Library: 303–6. doi:10.2307/2866337. eISSN 1538-3555. ISSN 0037-3222. JSTOR 2866337.
- Rasmussen, Eric (1984). "Fathers and Sons In Hamlet". Shakespeare Quarterly. 35 (4). Folger Shakespeare Library: 463. doi:10.2307/2870166. eISSN 1538-3555. ISSN 0037-3222. JSTOR 2870166.
- Rosenberg, Marvin (1992). The Masks of Hamlet. London: Associated University Presses. ISBN 0-87413-480-3.
- Rust, Jennifer (2003). "Wittenberg and Melancholic Allegory: The Reformation and Its Discontents in Hamlet". In Taylor, Dennis; Beauregard, David N. (eds.). Shakespeare and the Culture of Christianity in Early Modern England. Studies in Religion and Literature. New York: Fordham University Press. pp. 260–86. ISBN 9780823222834.
- Shelden, Michael (1977). "The Imagery of Constraint in Hamlet". Shakespeare Quarterly. 28 (3). Folger Shakespeare Library: 355–8. doi:10.2307/2869086. eISSN 1538-3555. ISSN 0037-3222. JSTOR 2869086.
- Shoemaker, Neille (1965). "The Aesthetic Criticism of Hamlet from 1692 to 1699". Shakespeare Quarterly. 16 (1). Folger Shakespeare Library: 99–103. doi:10.2307/2867741. eISSN 1538-3555. ISSN 0037-3222. JSTOR 2867741.
- Showalter, Elaine (1985). "Representing Ophelia: Women, Madness, and the Responsibilities of Feminist Criticism". In Parker, Patricia; Hartman, Geoffrey (eds.). Shakespeare and the Question of Theory. New York and London: Methuen. pp. 77–94. ISBN 0-416-36930-8.
- Smith, D. Nicoll (1903). "Introduction. Shakespearian Criticism in the Eighteenth Century". In Smith, D. Nicoll (ed.). Eighteenth Century Essays on Shakespeare. Glasgow: James MacLehose and Sons. hdl:2027/hvd.hwtrzv. OCLC 4321853.
- Stoll, Elmer Edgar (1992) [1919]. Hamlet: An Historical and Comparative Study. Research Publications of the University of Minnesota. Vol. VIII. Temecula, California: Reprint Services Corporation. ISBN 9780781272711.
- Thompson, Ann (2003). "Infinite Jest: The Comedy of Hamlet, Prince of Denmark". In Holland, Peter (ed.). Shakespeare and Comedy. Shakespeare Survey. Vol. 56. Cambridge: Cambridge University Press. pp. 93–104. doi:10.1017/CCOL0521827272.007. ISBN 9781139052702.
- Vickers, Brian, ed. (1995) [1974]. Shakespeare: The Critical Heritage (1623–1692). Vol. 1 (New ed.). London: Routledge. ISBN 9780415134040.
- Vickers, Brian, ed. (1995) [1974]. Shakespeare: The Critical Heritage (1753–1765). Vol. 4 (New ed.). London: Routledge. ISBN 9780415134071.
- Vickers, Brian, ed. (1995) [1974]. Shakespeare: The Critical Heritage (1765–1774). Vol. 5 (New ed.). London: Routledge. ISBN 9780415134088.
- Walpole, Horace (1968). "The Castle of Otranto". In Fairclough, Peter (ed.). Three Gothic Novels: The Castle of Otranto; Vathek; Frankenstein. London: Penguin Classics. ISBN 978-0140430363.
- Ward, David (1992). "The King and Hamlet". Shakespeare Quarterly. 43 (3). Folger Shakespeare Library: 280–302. doi:10.2307/2870529. eISSN 1538-3555. ISSN 0037-3222. JSTOR 2870529.
- Westlund, Joseph (1978). "Ambivalence in the Player's Speech in Hamlet". SEL: Studies in English Literature 1500–1900. 18 (2, Elizabethan and Jacobean Drama). Rice University: 245–56. doi:10.2307/450360. eISSN 1522-9270. ISSN 0039-3657. JSTOR 450360.
- Wilson, J. Dover (1944). The Fortunes of Falstaff. Cambridge: Cambridge University Press. LCCN 43018292. OCLC 509586. OL 6456735M.
