= William H. Quillian =

American literary critic

- Occupation: Professor
- Writing career
- Genres: 19th & 20th century British literature History of criticism and critical theory
- Subjects: James Joyce; T. S. Eliot
- Notable work: Hamlet and the New Poetic: James Joyce and T. S. Eliot

William Howell Quillian is an American literary critic and James Joyce scholar. He is Professor Emeritus of English at Mount Holyoke College.

== Background ==
Quillian graduated with an A.B. in English from Princeton University in 1965 after completing a senior thesis titled "The Name of Adam: A Study of Henry Miller." He then received a B.A. and M.A. from Cambridge University in 1973 and returned to Princeton for graduate studies. He received a Ph.D. from Princeton University in 1975 after completing a doctoral dissertation titled "Prince Hamlet in the age of modernism: James Joyce and T.S. Eliot."

== Publications ==
=== Select articles ===
- "Composition of Place': Joyce's Notes on the English Drama." James Joyce Quarterly, vol. 13, pp. 4–26, 1975.
- "Shakespeare in Trieste: Joyce's 1912 Hamlet Lectures." James Joyce Quarterly, vol. 12, pp. 7–63, 1975.

==== New York Times - Letters ====
- 20 September 2006: Response to the debate regarding Bob Dylan's 2006 album, Modern Times in light of T. S. Eliot.

=== Book ===
- Hamlet and the New Poetic: James Joyce and T. S. Eliot (Ann Arbor, MI: UMI Research Press, 1983).

== Joyce and hypertext ==
He has also been involved with Michael Groden's group in the envisioning and development of Joyce's Ulysses as hypertext and hypermedia as well as other aspects of the digital humanities.

== See also ==
- Modernist literature
- Modernist poetry
- Hypertext
