= Molly Peacock =

American poet

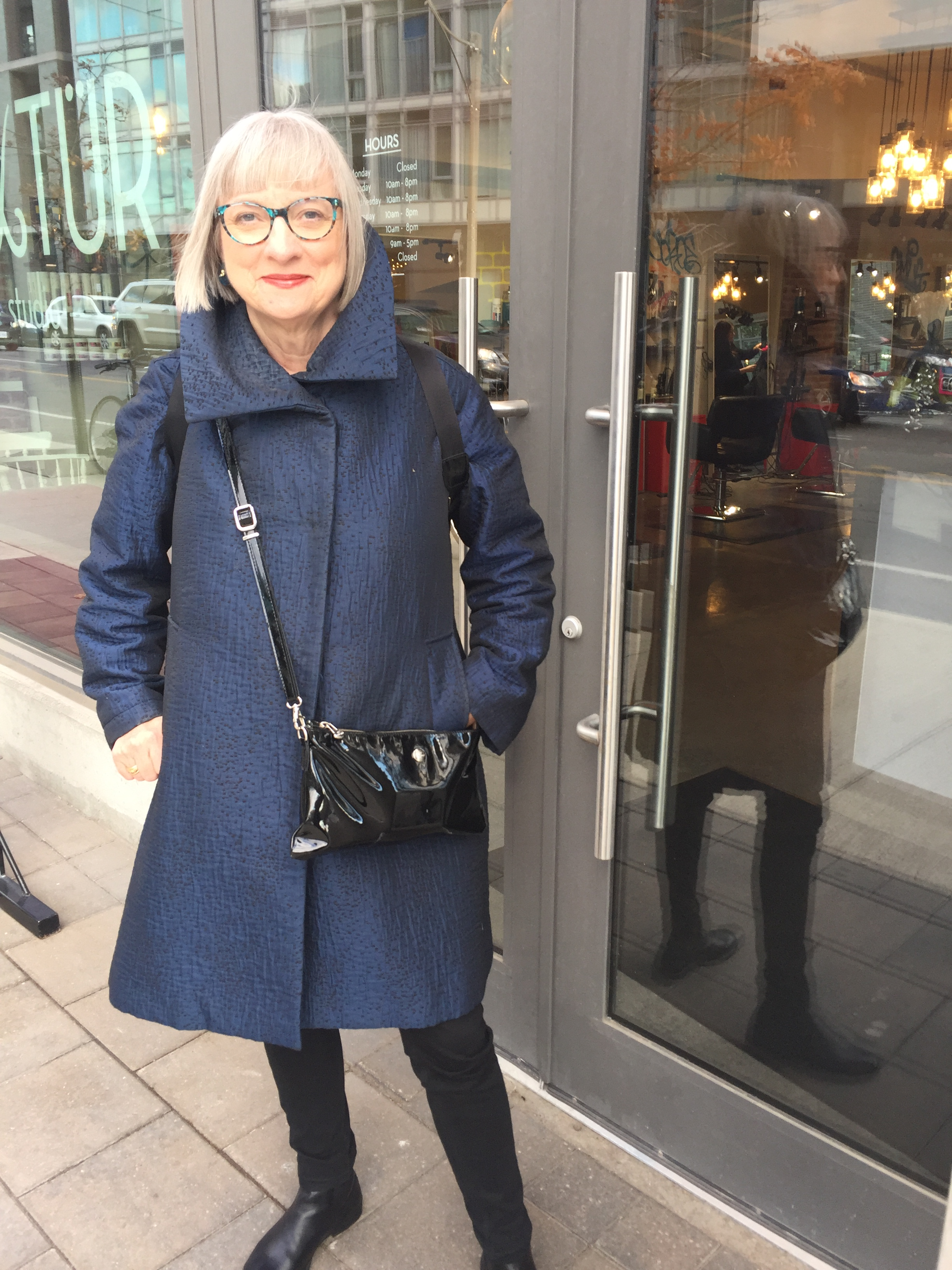
- Born: 1947 (age 78–79); Buffalo, New York, U.S.
- Occupations: Poet; essayist; biographer; speaker
- Website: mollypeacock.org

Molly Peacock (born 1947) is an American-Canadian poet, essayist, biographer and speaker, whose work includes memoir, short fiction, and a one-woman show.

== Career ==
Peacock's works include The Paper Garden (2011), which is both a biography of 18th-century gentlewoman Mary Delany and a meditation on late-life creativity. The Paper Garden was selected as a book of the year by The Economist, which said of the work: "Like flowers built of a millefeuille of paper, Ms Peacock builds a life out of layers of metaphor." Her 2018 book of poems The Analyst is a collection exploring her evolving relationship with her psychoanalyst who, after a stroke, reclaimed her life through painting.

Peacock's 2021 book Flower Diary: Mary Hiester Reid Paints, Travels, Marries & Opens a Door is a dual memoir and biography that examines the balance of creativity and domesticity in the life of Mary Hiester Reid, a painter who produced over three hundred floral still lifes and landscapes. One critic noted that the biography is written with the "lingering observations and lyrical touch of an established poet, yet with an easygoing, conversational tone often lacking in didactic art biographies." As with The Paper Garden, this "lush and beautifully produced" work also tracks Peacock's own marriage with academic Michael Groden.

She was a Faculty Mentor at the Spalding University Brief Residency MFA Program, 2001–13.

Peacock is also the author/performer of a one-woman show in poems, "The Shimmering Verge" produced by Louise Fagan Productions, reviewed by Laura Weinert in the New York Times. "She can inhabit a moment with quiet intensity: in a haunting poem about an alcoholic father hovering over her, she fully enters her scene, gripping the folds of fabric around her as if they might swallow her alive."

She has published seven collections of poetry, including The Second Blush, love poems from a midlife marriage and Cornucopia: New & Selected Poems. Her work is included in The Best of the Best American Poetry 1988–1997 and The Oxford Book of American Poetry, as well as in literary journals such as the Times Literary Supplement, The New Yorker, and The Paris Review.

Peacock is the author of a memoir, Paradise, Piece By Piece. Her essay on Mrs. Delany, "Passion Flowers in Winter", appeared in The Best American Essays. Other pieces appear in O: The Oprah Magazine, Elle, House & Garden, and New York Magazine. She is also the editor of a collection of creative non-fiction, Private I: Privacy in a Public World.

As President of the Poetry Society of America, Peacock was one of the creators of the Poetry in Motion program; coediting Poetry In Motion: One Hundred Poems From the Subways and Buses. She was also the Series Editor of The Best Canadian Poetry in English (Tightrope Books) from 2008 to 2017, as well as a Contributing Editor of the Literary Review of Canada.

== Personal life ==
Peacock was born in Buffalo, New York. Currently, she lives in downtown Toronto and holds dual Canadian-American citizenship. She was married to scholar Michael Groden, who died in March 2021.

== Writings ==
=== Poetry ===
- And Live Apart, University of Missouri Press, 1980, ISBN 978-0-8262-0288-8
- Raw Heaven, Random House, 1984, ISBN 978-0-394-53973-7
- Take Heart, Random House, 1989, ISBN 978-0-394-57515-5
- Original Love, Lightning Source Inc, 1996, ISBN 978-0-393-31466-3
- Cornucopia: New & Selected Poems, W.W. Norton, 2002, ISBN 978-0-393-05123-0
- The Second Blush: Poems. W. W. Norton & Company. 2008. ISBN 978-0-393-06651-7. "Molly Peacock."
- The Analyst, W.W. Norton. 2017. ISBN 978-0-393-25471-6

=== Fiction ===
- Alphabetique, 26 Characteristic Fictions, McClelland & Stewart, 2014, ISBN 978-0-7710-7015-0

=== Non-fiction ===
- Flower Diary: In Which Mary Hiester Reid Paints, Travels, Marries & Opens a Door. ECW Press. 2021. ISBN 978-1-77041-622-2.
- The Paper Garden: Mrs. Delany Begins Her Life's Work at 72. McClelland & Stewart. 2010. ISBN 978-0-7710-7033-4.; Bloomsbury Publishing USA, 2011, ISBN 978-1-60819-523-7
- How To Read A Poem and Start A Poetry Circle, Riverhead Books, 1999, ISBN 978-1-57322-128-3
- Paradise, Piece By Piece, Riverhead Books, 1998, ISBN 978-1-57322-097-2
- "Introduction". Understory. UPNE. 1996. ISBN 978-1-55553-286-4.

=== Edited anthologies ===
- Poetry in Motion: 100 Poems from the Buses and Subways (co-edited with Elise Paschen and Neil Neches). New York: Norton, 1996. ISBN 978-0-393-31458-8
- The Private I: Privacy in a Public World. Saint Paul: Graywolf P, 2001. ISBN 978-1-55597-313-1
- The Best Canadian Poetry in English (each annual volume co-edited with a different Guest Editor). Toronto: Tightrope Books, 2008— .

=== Selected essays ===
- "What the Mockingbird Said." Conversant Essays: Contemporary Poets on Poetry. Ed. James McCorkle. Detroit: Wayne State UP, 1990. 343–347.
- "One Green, One Blue: One Point about Formal Verse Writing and Another About Women Writing Formal Verse." A Formal Feeling Comes: Poems in Form by Contemporary Women. Ed. Annie Finch. Ashland, OR: Story Line P, 1994.
- "The Poet As Hybrid Memoirist." The Writer 112.2 (February 1999): 20–22.
- "From Gilded Cage to Rib Cage." After New Formalism: Poets on Form, Narrative, and Tradition. Ed. Annie Finch. Ashland, OR: Story Line P, 1999. 70–78.
- "Introduction." The Private I: Privacy in a Public World. vii-ix.
- "Sweet Uses of Adversity." The Private I: Privacy in a Public World. 80–94.
- "Rhyme and the Line." A Broken Thing: Poets on the Line. Eds. Emily Rosko and Anton Vander Zee. Iowa City: U of Iowa P, 2011. 176–177.
- "A Calendar of Affections." Arc Poetry Magazine 65 (2011): 166–171.
- "New Formalism at the Millenium." Green Mountains Review 25.1 (2012): 268–272.

== Honours ==
Peacock has received recognition from the Leon Levy Center for Biography (CUNY), Danforth Foundation, Ingram Merrill Foundation, Woodrow Wilson Foundation, National Endowment for the Arts, and New York State Council on the Arts. She was President of the Poetry Society of America from 1989 to 1995, and again from 1999 to 2001. She was Poet in Residence at the American Poets' Corner, Cathedral Church of St. John the Divine from 2000 to 2005. Peacock was Regents' Fellow at University of California, Riverside and Poet in Residence at Bucknell University and the University of Western Ontario.

=== Residencies ===
- The Poetry Center, 92nd Street YM/YWHA, New York. 1985–present.
- Poet-in-Residence, Poets' Corner, Cathedral of St. John the Divine, New York. 2000–2004.
- Visiting Writer, Bennington College 2002
- Woodrow Wilson Fellow 1994–2001
- Regents Lecturer, University of California, Riverside. 1998.
- Writer-in-Residence, University of Western Ontario. 1995–1996.
- Poet-in-Residence, Bucknell University. 1993.
- Visiting Poet, Columbia University, 1986, 1992.
- Poet-in-Residence, Barnard. 1989–1992.
- Visiting Poet, Sarah Lawrence College 1990.
- Visiting Poet, Hofstra University, 1986.
