= A. Walton Litz =

American historian

Arthur Walton Litz
- Litz, as a professor of English Literature at Princeton University

Arthur Walton Litz Jr. (October 31, 1929, in Nashville, Tennessee – June 4, 2014) was an American literary historian and critic who served as professor of English Literature at Princeton University from 1956 to 1993. He was the author or editor of over twenty collections of literary criticism, including various editions of Ezra Pound, James Joyce, Wallace Stevens, and T. S. Eliot.

Litz graduated with an A.B. in English from Princeton University in 1951 after completing a senior thesis titled "Yoknapatawpha: A Study of William Faulkner's Moral Vision." He then studied at Merton College, University of Oxford as a Rhodes Scholar and received his D.Phil. in 1954. He studied alongside and, at one point, lived with cultural theorist Stuart Hall, who described him as 'extraordinarily smart'. After two years' service in the U.S. Army, he became the Holmes Professor of Belles-Lettres at Princeton in 1956, where he worked until his retirement in 1994.

Litz was also a longtime instructor at the Bread Loaf School of English. He was named to the Eastman Visiting Professorship at Balliol College, Oxford, in 1989. In 1991, he was elected to the American Philosophical Society.

Litz married Marian Weller in 1958; they had four children. He died of respiratory failure on June 4, 2014, aged 84, at the University Medical Center of Princeton in Plainsboro, New Jersey. He is survived by his four children and six grandchildren.
