= SEL: Studies in English Literature 1500–1900 =

- Discipline: Literature
- Language: English
- Edited by: Amy Kahrmann Huseby

Publication details
- History: 1961–present
- Publisher: Johns Hopkins University Press (United States)
- Frequency: Quarterly

Standard abbreviations
- ISO 4: SEL Stud. Engl. Lit. 1500–1900

Indexing
- ISSN: 0039-3657 (print); 1522-9270 (web)
- OCLC no.: 1766723

Links
- Journal homepage; Online access

SEL: Studies in English Literature 1500–1900 is an academic journal founded in 1956. It publishes articles concerning four categories of British literature from 1500 to 1900—English Renaissance, Tudor and Stuart drama, Restoration and 18th century, and 19th century. Each issue focuses on one of these four areas of concern along with an omnibus review of recent studies. Its executive editor is Amy Kahrmann Huseby of Rice University.

The journal is published quarterly in February, May, August, and November by the Johns Hopkins University Press, available on Project Muse. The average length of an issue is 224 pages.
