= Margreta de Grazia =

Italian-American scholar of Shakespeare

Margreta de Grazia FRSL
- Born: 1946 (age 79–80)
- Awards: Fellow of the Royal Society of Literature (2021), Guggenheim Fellowship

Academic background
- Education: Bryn Mawr College (BA), Princeton University (MA, PhD)

Academic work
- Institutions: University of Pennsylvania
- Notable works: Shakespeare Verbatim, Hamlet without Hamlet, Shakespeare Without a Life

Margreta de Grazia FRSL (born 1946), Emerita Professor of English and the Humanities at the University of Pennsylvania, is a scholar of Early Modern studies.

== Education ==
De Grazia received her BA from Bryn Mawr College and her MA and PhD from Princeton University in English Renaissance studies.

== Career and awards ==
De Grazia taught at the University of New Mexico and at Georgetown University, before joining the faculty of the University of Pennsylvania in 1983.

She has received fellowships from the John Simon Guggenheim Memorial Foundation, the American Council of Learned Societies and the National Humanities Center.

The elected her as a Fellow in 2021.

== Selected works ==
- Shakespeare Verbatim: The Reproduction of Authenticity and the 1790 Apparatus. Clarendon. 1991. ISBN 9780198117780.
- Ed. with Maureen Quilligan and Peter Stallybrass, Subject and Object in Renaissance Culture. Cambridge. 1996. ISBN 0521455898
- Ed. with Stanley Wells, Cambridge Companion to Shakespeare. Cambridge. 2001. ISBN 9781139000109
- Hamlet without Hamlet. Cambridge University. 2007. ISBN 9780521690362.
- Ed. with Stanley Wells, New Cambridge Companion to Shakespeare. Cambridge. 2010. ISBN
- Four Shakespearean Period Pieces. University of Chicago. 2021. ISBN 9780226785226.
- Shakespeare Without a Life. Oxford University. 2023. ISBN 9780198812548.
