= Calendar of saints (disambiguation) =

The calendar of saints is a traditional Christian method of organizing a liturgical year by associating each day with one or more saints.

Calendar of saints may specifically refer to:

- Calendar of saints (Anglican Church of Australia)
- Calendar of saints (Anglican Church of Canada)
- Calendar of saints (Anglican Church of Korea)
- Calendar of saints (Anglican Church of Southern Africa)
- Calendar of saints (Armenian Apostolic Church)
- Calendar of saints (Church of England)
- Calendar of saints (Church in Wales)
- Calendar of saints (Episcopal Church)
- Calendar of saints (Episcopal Anglican Church of Brazil)
- Calendar of saints (Hong Kong Sheng Kung Hui)
- Calendar of saints (Lutheran)
- Calendar of saints (Orthodox Tewahedo)
- General Roman Calendar of 1969 – calendar of saints used by the Catholic Church
- Calendar of saints (Scottish Episcopal Church)
