= List of Anglican Church calendars =

The Church of England uses a liturgical year that is in most respects identical to that of the Catholic Church. While this is less true of the calendars contained within the Book of Common Prayer and the Alternative Service Book (1980), it is particularly true since the Anglican Church adopted its new pattern of services and liturgies contained within Common Worship, in 2000. Certainly, the broad division of the year into the Christmas and Easter seasons, interspersed with periods of Ordinary Time, is identical, and most Festivals and Commemorations are also celebrated, with some exceptions.

In some Anglican traditions (including the Church of England), the Christmas season is followed by an Epiphany season, which begins on the Eve of the Epiphany (on 6 January or the nearest Sunday) and ends on the Feast of the Presentation (on 2 February or the nearest Sunday). Ordinary Time then begins after this period.

The Book of Common Prayer contains within it the traditional Western Eucharistic lectionary which traces its roots to the Comes of St Jerome in the 5th century. Its similarity to the ancient lectionary is particularly obvious during Trinity season (Sundays after the Sunday after Pentecost), reflecting that understanding of sanctification.

== Calendars of saints' days in churches throughout the Anglican Communion ==
The list is organised alphabetically by the name of the province, with the exception of single countries separated into several provinces, i.e. North India and South India.

A

- Calendar of saints (Anglican Church in Aotearoa, New Zealand and Polynesia)
- Calendar of saints (Anglican Church of Australia)

B

- Calendar of saints (Church of Bangladesh)
- Calendar of saints (Anglican Church of Bermuda)
- Calendar of saints (Episcopal Anglican Church of Brazil)
- Calendar of saints (Anglican Church of Burundi)

C

- Calendar of saints (Anglican Church of Canada)
- Calendar of saints (Church of the Province of Central Africa)
- Calendar of saints (Anglican Church in Central America)
- Calendar of saints (Church of Ceylon)
- Calendar of saints (Church of the Province of the Congo)
- Calendar of saints (Episcopal Church of Cuba)

E

- Calendar of saints (Church of England)

F

- Calendar of saints (Parish of the Falkland Islands)

H

- Calendar of saints (Hong Kong Sheng Kung Hui)

I

- Calendar of saints (Church of North India)
- Calendar of saints (Church of South India)
- Calendar of saints (Church of the Province of the Indian Ocean)
- Calendar of saints (Church of Ireland)

J

- Calendar of saints (Anglican Communion in Japan)
- Calendar of saints (Episcopal Church in Jerusalem and the Middle East)

K

- Calendar of saints (Anglican Church of Kenya)
- Calendar of saints (Anglican Church of Korea)

L

- Calendar of saints (Lusitanian Catholic Apostolic Evangelical Church)

M

- Calendar of saints (Anglican Church of Mexico)
- Calendar of saints (Church of the Province of Myanmar)

N

- Calendar of saints (Church of Nigeria)

P

- Calendar of saints (Church of Pakistan)
- Calendar of saints (Anglican Church of Papua New Guinea)
- Calendar of saints (Episcopal Church in the Philippines)

R

- Calendar of saints (Episcopal Church of Rwanda)

S

- Calendar of saints (Scottish Episcopal Church)
- Calendar of saints (Church of the Province of South East Asia)
- Calendar of saints (Anglican Church of Southern Africa)
- Calendar of saints (Anglican Church of the Southern Cone of the Americas)
- Calendar of saints (Spanish Reformed Episcopal Church)
- Calendar of saints (Episcopal Church of the Sudan)

T

- Calendar of saints (Anglican Church of Tanzania)

U

- Calendar of saints (Church of the Province of Uganda)
- Calendar of saints (Episcopal Church) - Episcopal Church in the United States of America

W

- Calendar of saints (Church in Wales)
- Calendar of saints (Church of the Province of West Africa)
- Calendar of saints (Church in the Province of the West Indies)
