= Modern Martyrs =

Ten statues at Westminster Abbey

Coordinates: 51.4995°N 0.1285°W

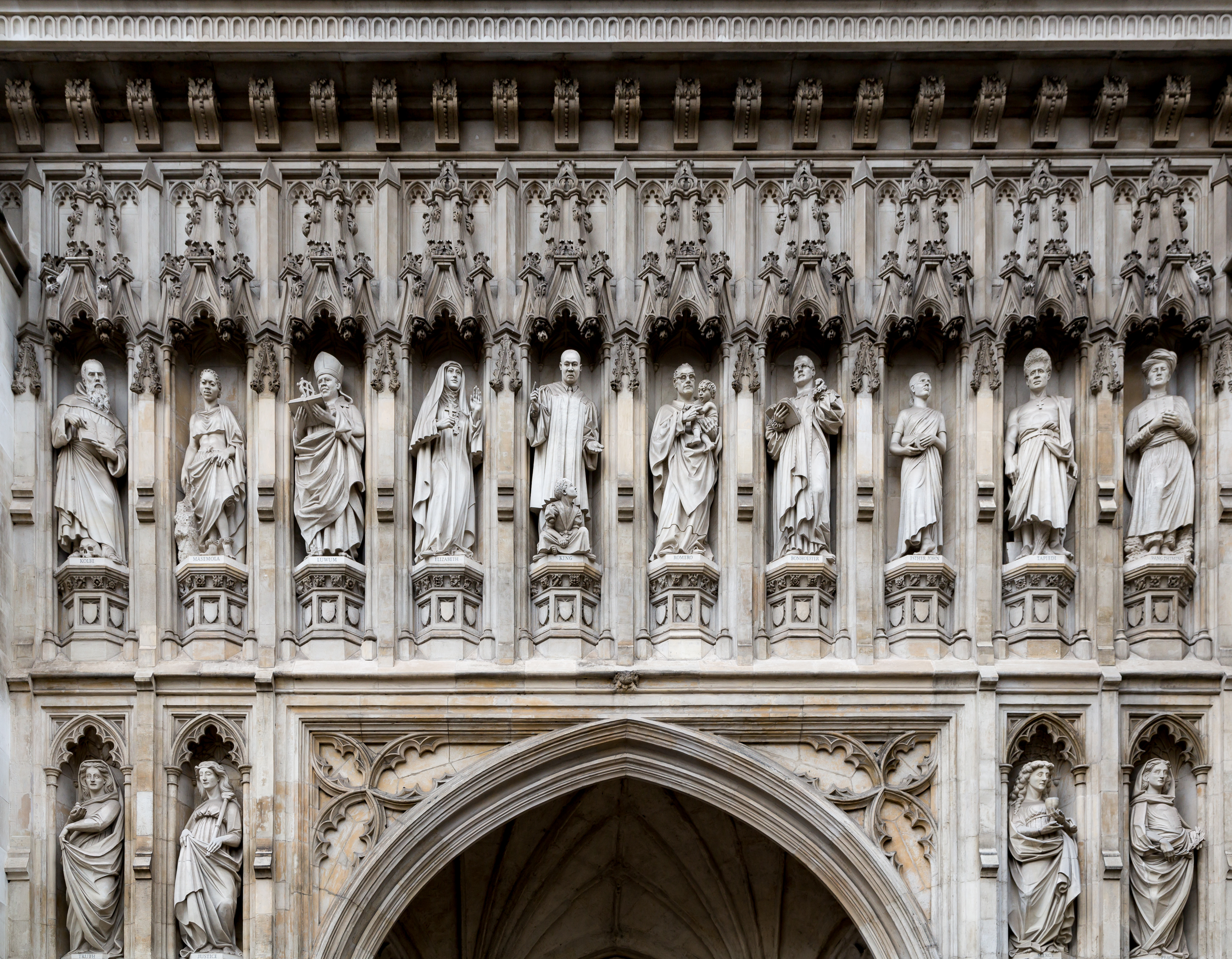
The Modern Martyrs on Westminster Abbey, from left to right: KOLBE, MASEMOLA, LUWUM, ELIZABETH, KING, ROMERO, BONHOEFFER, JOHN, TAPIEDI, WANG ZHIMING

The Modern Martyrs are a set of ten niche statues just above the Great West Door of Westminster Abbey in the City of Westminster, London. The Abbey is known for its significant number of monuments and memorials as well as thousands of graves.

Despite the section of the facade where they stand being built in the 15th century, they had never been filled with statues. They stand above four statues that represent Truth, Justice, Mercy and Peace which were installed in 1992. The current martyr statues represent Christians of various denominations who died fighting for their beliefs or under religious persecution in the 20th century and were unveiled in 1998 by the Archbishop of Canterbury with Elizabeth II, Prince Philip, and many religious leaders present. They were designed by Tim Crawley and installed as part of a broader restoration project for the whole Abbey.

In 2024, a history of the lives of the Martyrs was written by James Hawkey, a Canon Theologian of Westminster Abbey, titled The Noble Army: The Modern Martyrs of Westminster Abbey.

== Gallery ==
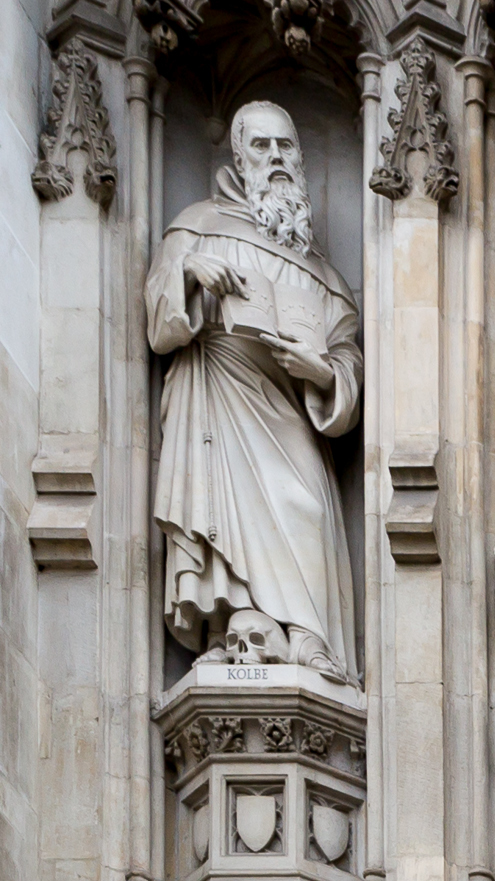
Maximilian Kolbe by Andrew Tanser

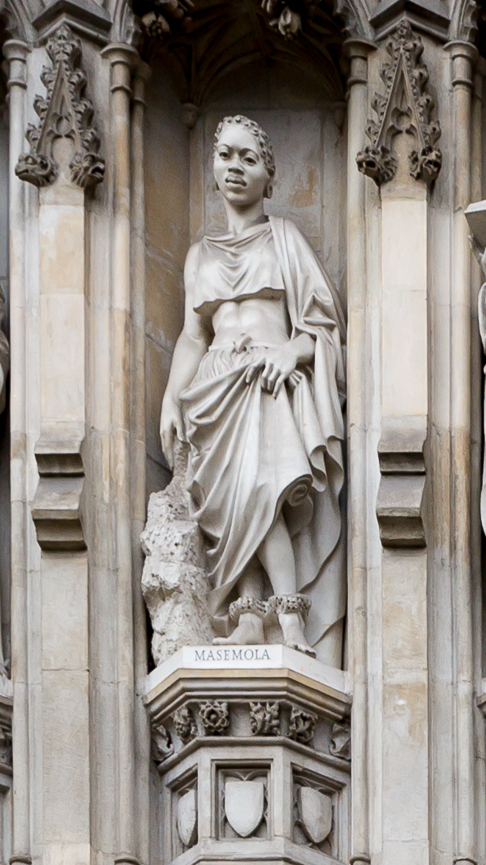
Manche Masemola by John Roberts

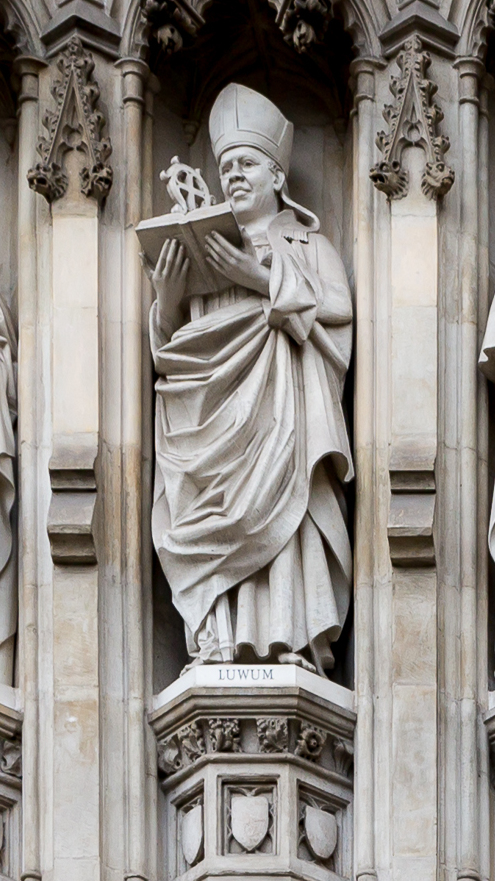
Janani Luwum by Neil Simmons

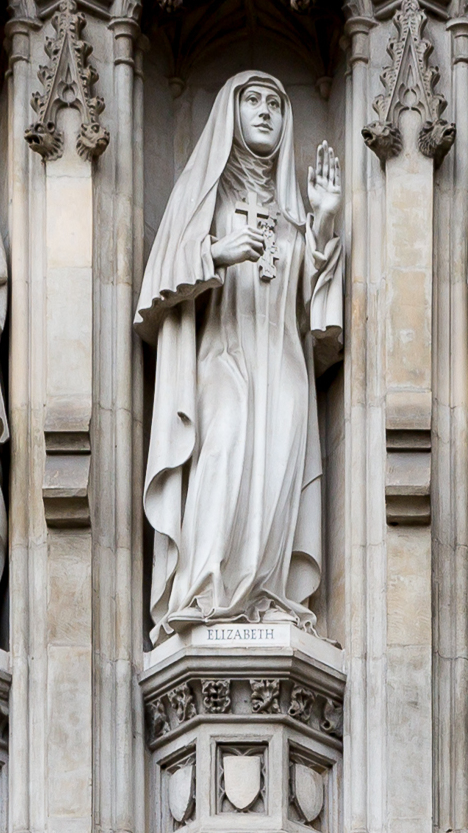
Grand Duchess Elizabeth of Russia by John Roberts

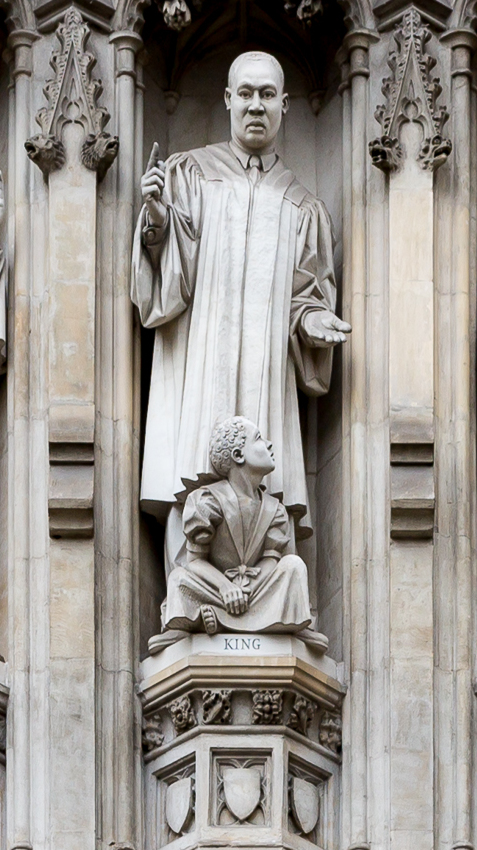
Martin Luther King Jr. by Tim Crawley

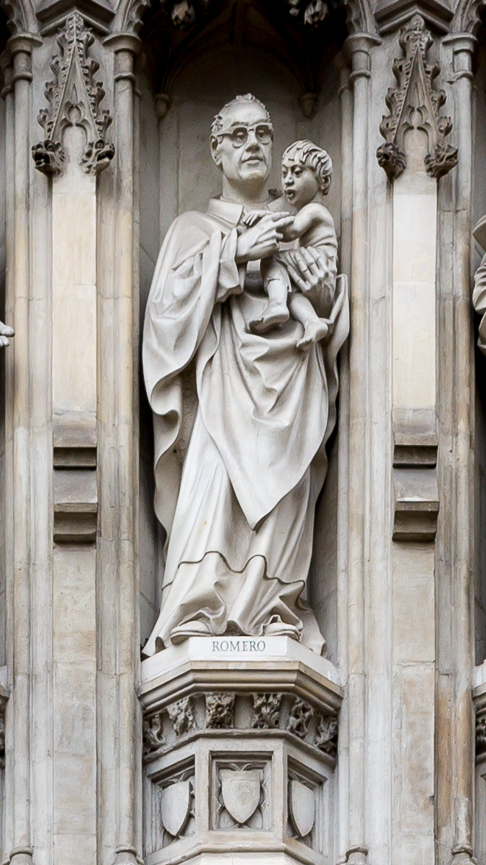
Óscar Romero by John Roberts

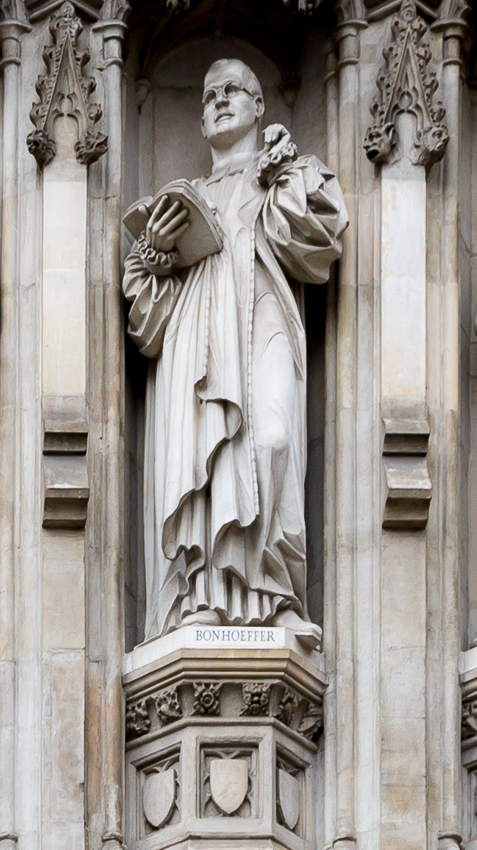
Dietrich Bonhoeffer by Tim Crawley

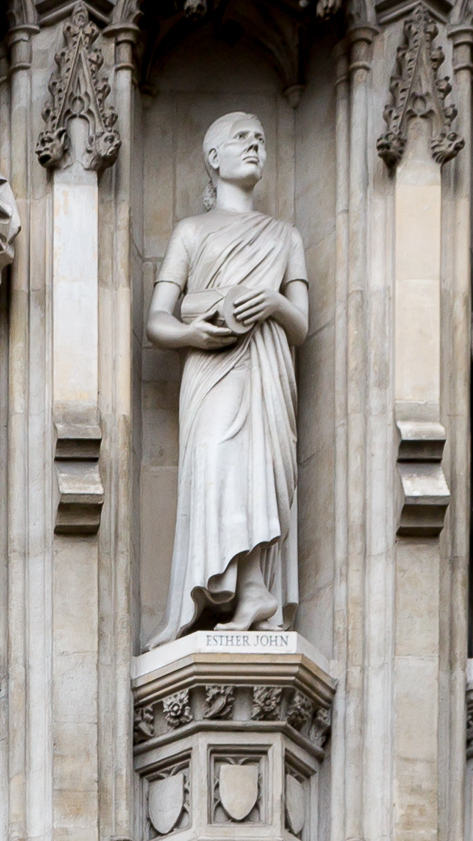
Esther John by Neil Simmons

Lucian Tapiedi by Tim Crawley

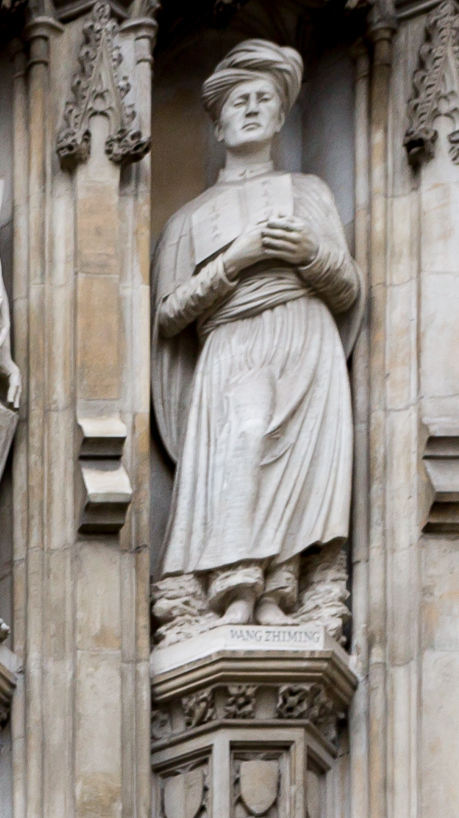
Wang Zhiming by Neil Simmons
