= Thomas Traherne =

English poet, clergyman, theologian, and religious writer

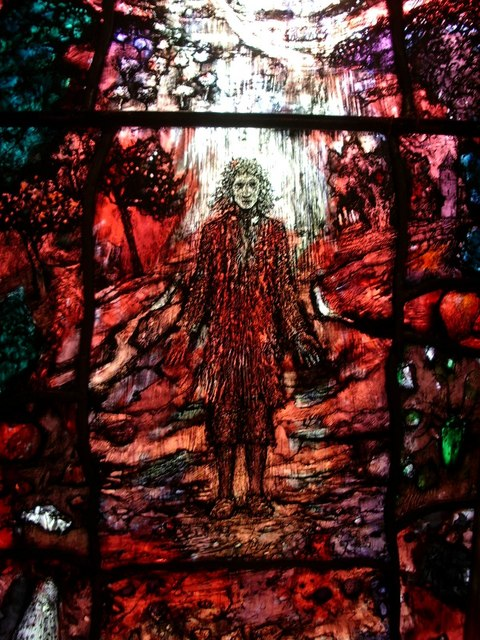
- One of the four Traherne Windows in Audley Chapel, Hereford Cathedral, created by stained-glass artist Tom Denny
- Born: c. 1636–38; Hereford, England
- Died: 27 September 1674; Teddington, Middlesex, England
- Education: Brasenose College, Oxford
- Occupations: Poet, author, priest, theologian
- Notable work: Centuries of Meditations
- Style: metaphysical poetry, meditations, theology

Thomas Traherne (/trəˈhɑːrn/; 1636 or 1637 – c. 27 September 1674) was an English poet, Anglican cleric, theologian, and religious writer. The intense, scholarly spirituality in his writings has led to his being commemorated by some parts of the Anglican Communion on 10 October (the anniversary of his burial in 1674) or on 27 September.

The work for which Traherne is best known today is the Centuries of Meditations, a collection of short paragraphs in which he reflects on Christian life and ministry, philosophy, happiness, desire and childhood. This was first published in 1908 after having been rediscovered in manuscript ten years earlier. His poetry likewise was first published in 1903 and 1910 (The Poetical Works of Thomas Traherne, B.D. and Poems of Felicity). His prose works include Roman Forgeries (1673), Christian Ethics (1675), and A Serious and Patheticall Contemplation of the Mercies of God (1699).

Traherne's writings frequently explore the glory of creation and what he saw as his intimate relationship with God. His writing conveys an ardent, almost childlike love of God, and is compared to similar themes in the works of later poets William Blake, Walt Whitman, and Gerard Manley Hopkins. His love for the natural world is frequently expressed in his works by a treatment of nature that evokes Romanticism—two centuries before the Romantic movement.

== Biography ==
=== Early life and education ===
Traherne's birth and baptism are not recorded in parish registers. According to antiquarian Anthony à Wood (1632–1695), he was a "shoemaker's son of Hereford" born in either 1636 or 1637. Bertram Dobell identifies this shoemaker as John Traherne (born 1566). However, other sources say that Thomas was the son of Philipp Traherne (or Trehearne) (1568–1645), a local innkeeper and twice Mayor of Hereford, and his third wife, Mary Lane. (Note: Philipp was married three times and had 10 children from these marriages. Thomas, the poet and writer, was the oldest of two sons born to Philipp's third wife, Mary (or Marie) Lane. Thomas was the second of Philipp's sons to be named Thomas—the first, the youngest son by his second wife, died in infancy.)

Traherne writes about his childhood, which included a natural wonder at and appreciation of the world around him, in Centuries of Meditations and in his poetry.

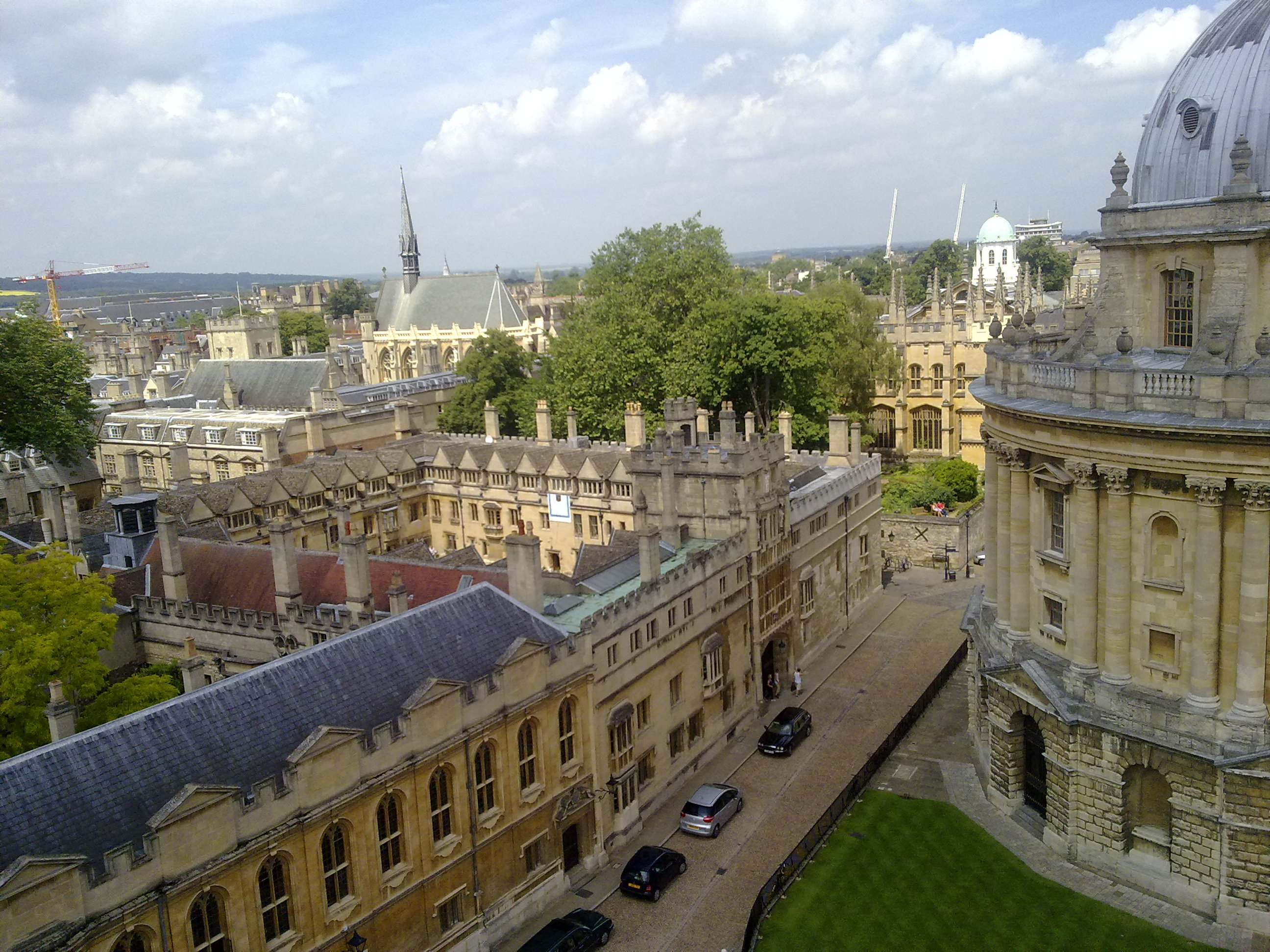
Traherne matriculated at Brasenose College, Oxford (left) in 1652 and received his degree in 1656.

Traherne was educated at Hereford Cathedral School and matriculated in Brasenose College, Oxford, on 2 April 1652, receiving his baccalaureate degree on 13 October 1656. Five years later he was promoted to the degree of Master of Arts (Oxon.) on 6 November 1661, and he received a Bachelor of Divinity (B.D.) on 11 December 1669.

=== Church ministry ===
After receiving his baccalaureate degree from Oxford in 1656, he took holy orders.

On 30 December 1657, he was appointed as the rector of Credenhill near Hereford, by the Commissioners for the Approbation of Public Preachers, although at the time he was not an ordained priest. A curious note appended to the record of his appointment is that Traherne counted upon the patronage of Amabel Fane, the widow of the Earl of Kent. (Note: Annabel or Amabel (nee Benn), widow of Henry Grey, 10th Earl of Kent) Traherne served in this post for ten years.

Following the restoration of the monarchy and the return of Charles II, Traherne was ordained priest on 20 October 1660 by the Bishop of Oxford, Robert Skinner, at Launton near Bicester.

In 1667, Traherne became the private chaplain to Sir Orlando Bridgeman, 1st Baronet, of Great Lever, the Lord Keeper of the Great Seal to King Charles II, at Teddington (near Hampton Court) in Middlesex. It was while residing there that Traherne died on 27 September 1674, having that day dictated a brief nuncupative will to his friend and neighbour John Berdoe, in which he made bequests to the servants who had looked after him and left his few belongings to his brother Philip and sister-in-law Susan. On 10 October 1674 he was buried in St Mary's Church at Teddington, under the church's reading desk.

=== Character and lifestyle ===
Traherne was described as "one of the most pious ingenious men that ever I was acquainted with", and "a man of a cheerful and sprightly Temper … ready to do all good Offices to his Friends, and Charitable to the Poor almost beyond his ability". Traherne believed he suffered from the weaknesses of a sociable personality: "Too much openness and proneness to Speak are my Diseas. Too easy and complying a Nature".

Anthony à Wood writes that Traherne "always led a simple and devout life; his will shows that he possessed little beyond his books ...".

== Writings ==
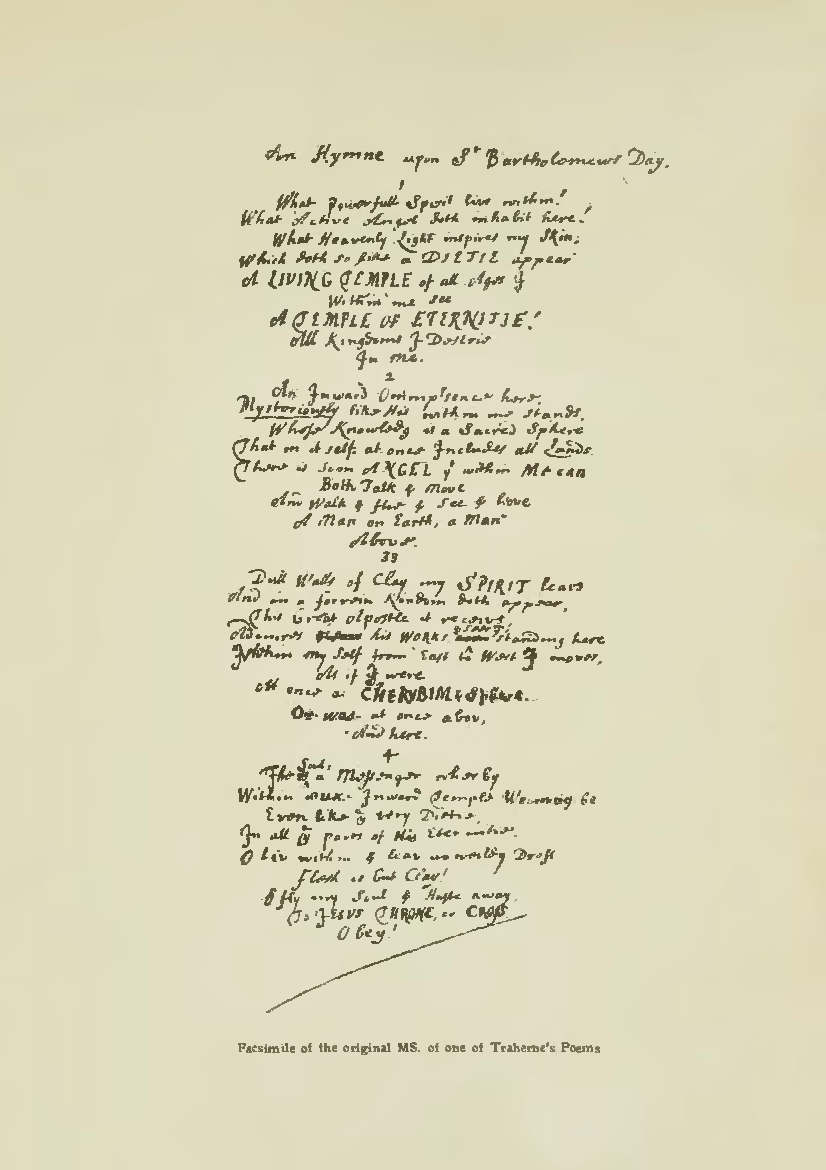
Facsimile of the manuscript of Thomas Traherne's poem "An Hymne upon St. Bartholomew's Day", from Bertram Dobell's 1903 edition of his poetical works

=== Publication history during lifetime and soon after ===
Traherne was an inconsequential literary figure during his lifetime and his works were not known or appreciated until long after his death. As a country priest he led a devout, humble life and did not participate in literary circles. Only one of his works, Roman Forgeries (1673), was published in his lifetime. Christian Ethicks (1675) followed soon after his death, and later A Serious and Patheticall Contemplation of the Mercies of God (1699), which was published as the work of an anonymous author whose character and background were discussed in a brief introduction by the publisher.

At Traherne's death in 1674 most of his manuscripts were bequeathed to his brother Philip. After Philip's death they apparently passed into the possession of the Skipp family of Ledbury in Herefordshire, where they languished for almost 200 years. In 1888 the family's assets were dissolved, yet the manuscripts did not re-emerge until 10 years later.

=== Later publication history ===
In the winter of 1896–97, William T. Brooke of London discovered some anonymous manuscripts in a "barrow of books about to be trashed" or a "street bookstall". Brooke thought that they might be lost works by Henry Vaughan and showed them to Alexander Grosart (1827–99), a Scottish clergyman and expert on Elizabethan and Jacobean literature who reprinted rare works. Grosart agreed that the manuscripts were by Vaughan and planned to include them in an edition of Vaughan's works that he was preparing for publication. Grosart died in 1899 and the proposed edition was never completed.

Grosart's collection, including the manuscripts, was purchased by Charles Higham, a London bookseller, who asked his friend Bertram Dobell to examine them. Dobell was convinced that they were not by Vaughan and soon deduced that they were by Traherne. The manuscripts included poetry as well as a collection of contemplative paragraphs "embodying reflexions on religion and morals".

The Poetical Works of Thomas Traherne was published in 1903 and Centuries of Meditations in 1908. Other publications followed. Eventually the Centuries were to be described as "one of the finest prose-poems in our language" and passages from them were set to music almost as often as the poems.

=== Manuscripts ===
A Traherne manuscript of "Centuries", the Dobell Folio (also called the "Commonplace Book"), "The Church's Year Book", and the "Early Notebook" (also called Philip Traherne's Notebook) are held at the Bodleian Library, Oxford; the Burney Manuscript (also known as "Poems of Felicity") is at the British Library, London; and "Select Meditations" is in the Osborn Collection, Beinecke Library, New Haven, Connecticut.

A manuscript discovered in 1996 in the Folger Library in Washington, D.C., by Julia Smith and Laetitia Yeandle was later identified as an unfinished 1,800-line epic poem by Traherne entitled "The Ceremonial Law". In 1997 Jeremy Maule, a Fellow of Trinity College, Cambridge, discovered more works by Traherne among 4,000 manuscripts in the Library of Lambeth Palace, the London residence of the Archbishop of Canterbury. The Lambeth manuscripts, mostly prose, encompass four complete works and a fragment of a fifth: Inducements to Retiredness, A Sober View of Dr Twisse, Seeds of Eternity, The Kingdom of God and the fragmentary Love.

== Reception of the poetry ==
Although Traherne is now counted one of the leading Metaphysical poets, the name of that "school" went unmentioned on his first publication. In his preface to The Poetical Works, Dobell linked him with "that small group of religious poets which includes Herbert, Vaughan and Crawshaw", but distinguished him as uniquely individual and "neither a follower nor imitator of any of these". In the selection of his poems that followed two years later, they were accompanied in the same volume by the 'verse-remains' of Henry Vaughan's twin brother Thomas (Eugenius Philalethes) and John Norris of Bemerton. The reputation of the two latter was then and remains as philosophers. Both were also clergymen and Norris was the incumbent of Herbert's former parsonage; it was not until much later that he was to be described also as "the last of the Metaphysicals". Traherne, then, is being presented by propinquity as a representative of the line of 17th-century devotional poets rather than the member of a particular school.

At the time of publication, those writers whom Samuel Johnson had described dismissively as "metaphysical poets" had yet to achieve the critical prominence they were given after the appearance of Herbert Grierson's anthology, Metaphysical Lyrics and Poems of the Seventeenth Century (1921). In any case, none of Traherne's poems were included there and when he did come to the notice of T. S. Eliot, it was only to be put aside as "more a mystic than a poet". After that, it took decades before his work was given more serious scrutiny.

Certainly, the mystical element is strikingly evident in Traherne, but his Metaphysical credentials are confirmed by the way in which he seeks to explain issues of truth, knowledge, and the faculties of the mind and heart by methods of theological and rational examination. Typical also is the way in which these meditations are worked out as extended Baroque conceits, of which "Shadows in the Water" is a particularly striking example. A further link with fellow devotional poets of his period is found in the idealisation of childish innocence and the use of Platonic themes which Traherne shares with Henry Vaughan and John Norris.

== Influences ==
=== Development of personal faith ===
Given some of the autobiographical and confessional material in his works (notably in Centuries of Meditations), Traherne must have suffered from a lack of faith in his formative years at Oxford. He describes this as a period of Apostasy and that he later found his way back to faith:

I knew by intuition those things which since my Apostasy, I collected again by the highest reason. My very ignorance was advantageous. I seemed as one brought into the Estate of Innocence. All things were spotless and pure and glorious: yea, and infinitely mine, and joyful and precious, I knew not that there were any sins or complaints or laws.

However, there is an alternative reading possible, which may be closer to the facts of Traherne's experience as he expresses them in the quote above. This is that he did not suffer a loss of faith, but rather identified his maturation away from a natural, innocent child's view of the world and his place in it, from an innate understanding of the wonder of God's creation, to a burdened grappling with the rules and expectation of church and society as an apostasy itself, which he had to overcome then by careful and disciplined study ("the highest reason"). This childlike, accepting, and joyous view of faith and religious ecstasy is at the core of the writing from which the excerpt above is drawn, and is part of the reason for Traherne's appeal.

=== Neoplatonism ===
Traherne is heavily influenced by the works of Neoplatonist philosophers and by several of his contemporaries who were called the Cambridge Platonists. The Cambridge Platonists were latitudinarians in that they argued for moderation and dialogue between the factions of Puritans and High Churchmen in the Anglican church. They believed that religion and reason could be in harmony with one another based on a mystical understanding of reason—believing that reason rose beyond mere sense perception and was "the candle of the Lord" and an echo of the divine residing within the human soul. Reason was both God-given and of God. (Note: For more on the Cambridge Platonists, see Patrides 1980 and Hutton 2008.) Indeed, the critic K. W. Salter notes that Traherne "writes of the senses as if they were spiritual and of the spirit as if it were sensuous." In her 1946 biography of Traherne, however, Gladys Wade noted that the Cambridge Platonists "wasted their energies on Hermetic and Cabalistic and Rosicrucian lore, and on incredible experiments in magic and necromancy", and remarked that Traherne's mysticism was "perfectly free from any taint of this".

== Theology and ethical themes ==
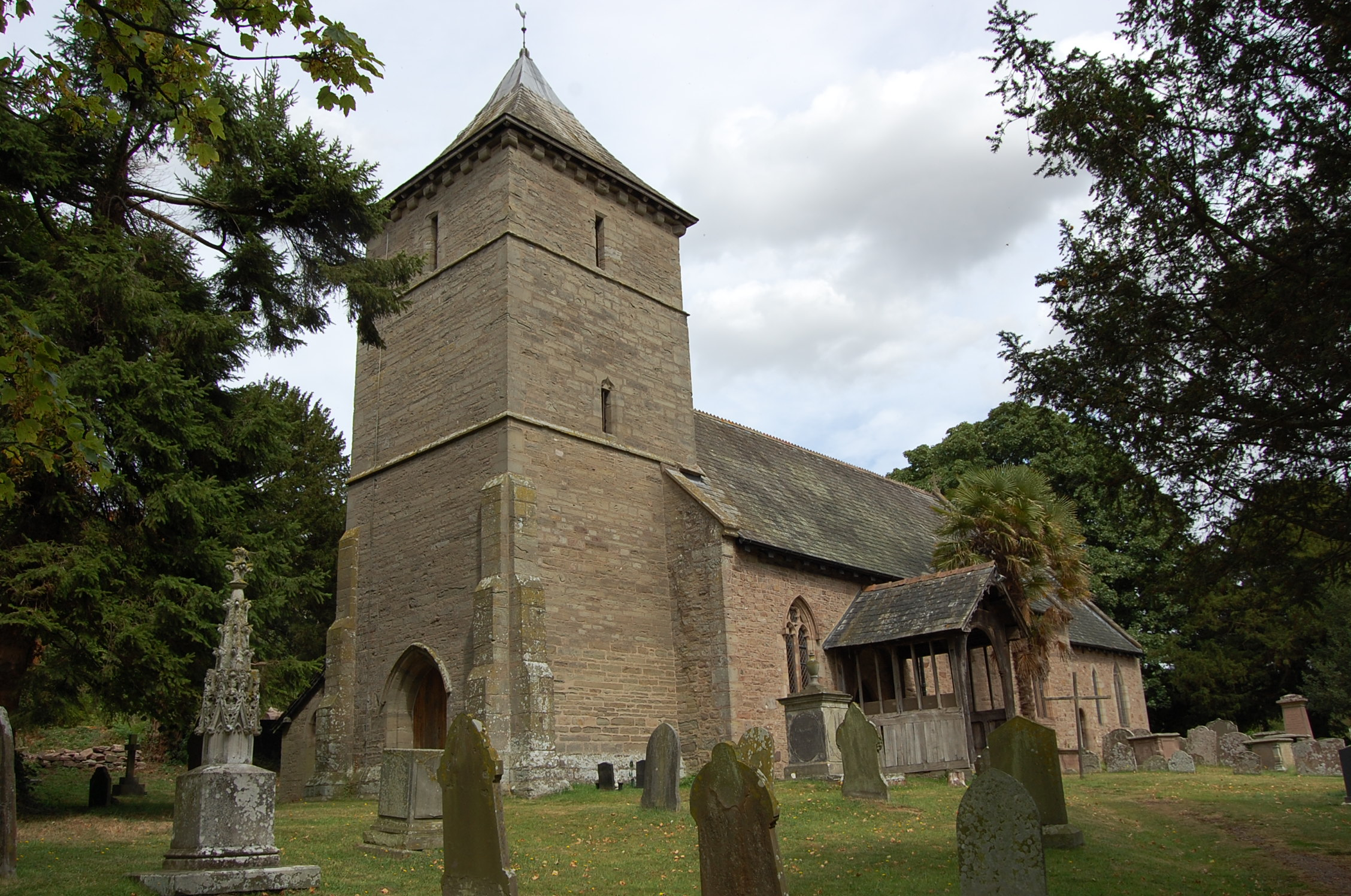
St Mary's, Credenhill, Herefordshire, where Traherne was rector

=== Defence of Anglican and criticism of Catholic churches ===
Traherne was also concerned with the stability of the Christian church in England during the period of the Restoration. In some of his theological writings, Traherne exhibits a passion for the Anglican faith and the national church that is evident in his confrontations with Roman Catholicism and Nonconformism during this time of political and religious upheaval. The recent discoveries of previously unknown manuscripts further establish Traherne's reputation as an Anglican divine and his works offer fresh and comprehensive insight on ongoing theological arguments regarding the nature of divinity, ethics and morality, and the nature of sin.

For instance, Traherne passionately critiques Roman Catholicism in Roman Forgeries (1673)—the only work published during his lifetime. It is a polemical treatise in the form of a dialogue between two men—a Protestant and a Roman Catholic. Relying on the Scriptures and the pronouncements of the First Council of Nicaea to formulate the idea of a legitimate church authority, Traherne criticises the state of the contemporary Catholic Church and claims through a conspiracy theory that because the Vatican has had control over the manuscripts that the Catholic Church was in a position to corrupt, misuse or suppress documents to support its claim to authority. The abusive nature of the narrator's critique of the Church of Rome is in sharp contrast to the tenor of Traherne's poetry or his other writings on theological topics.

However, Traherne takes a less polemic tone in the posthumously published Christian Ethicks (1675) in which he explores theological implications of Calvinist thought on freedom and necessity. In this work, Traherne refuses to define ethics as a secular phenomenon—instead pointing to a firm reliance on the will of God. Because of human limitations and failings, one cannot build a suitable and coherent moral system of beliefs—those virtues must derive from a divine source and their reward from perceiving the infinite love of God at the root of all things.

=== Sin ===
Traherne dedicated considerable examination to the subject of sin and its place vis-a-vis the church doctrines. In the recently discovered work, A Sober View of Dr Twisse, Traherne discusses sin and salvation within the frame of a larger discussion of questions of election and reprobation. Traherne writes:

He was excluded the Kingdom of Heaven, where nothing can enter that hates God, and whence nothing can be excluded that loves him. The loss of that Love is Hell: the Sight and Possession of that Love is Heaven. Thus did sin exclude him Heaven.

=== Mysticism and divine union ===
Traherne's works are inherently mystical in that they seek to understand and embrace the nature of God within his creation and within man's soul. Traherne seems to describe his own journey of faith in Centuries of Meditation, which was likely written when Traherne was at Credenhill—a work that is noted for its "spiritual intensity," and "the wide scope of the writer's survey" which includes "all heaven and earth he takes for the province of the pious soul". Traherne's work is said to look "upon the hidden things of the soul, and, in them, he sees the image of the glory and love of God" and "the eternal theme of the goodness and the splendour of God."

Traherne's poems frequently explore the glory of creation and what he perceived as his intimate relationship with God. He drew deeply on the writings of Aristotle and on the early Church Fathers for his concept of Man and human nature.

Little mention is made of sin and suffering in the works that have dominated 20th-century criticism, and some critics have seen his verse as bordering upon pantheism (or perhaps panentheism).

=== Felicity ===
At the core of Traherne's work is the concept of "felicity", that highest state of bliss in which he describes the essence of God as a source of "Delights of inestimable value."

Traherne says that 'understanding set in him' secured his felicity. He argues that man can experience this felicity only by understanding the will of God and divine love and he describes the beauty of this in childlike terms. Traherne seeks to explain the "Principle of Nature" in which through his inclination to love truth ("Light") and beauty seek him to identify felicity as its source and a natural experience.

== Other themes ==
=== Nature ===
Another great passion that is depicted in Traherne's work is his love of nature and the natural world, frequently displayed in a very Romantic treatment of nature that has been described as characteristically pantheist or panentheist. While Traherne credits a divine source for its creation, his praise of nature seems nothing less than what one would expect to find in Thoreau. Many scholars consider Traherne a writer of the sublime, and in his writing he seems to have tried to reclaim the lost appreciation for the natural world, as well as paying tribute to what he knew of in nature that was more powerful than he was. In this sense Traherne seems to have anticipated the Romantic movement more than 130 years before it actually occurred. There is frequent discussion of man's almost symbiotic relationship with nature, as well as frequent use of "literal setting", that is, an attempt to faithfully reproduce a sense experience from a given moment, a technique later used frequently by William Wordsworth.

=== Childlike joy and attitude ===
In the spirit of the gospels, Traherne's "great theme is the visionary innocence of childhood," and his writings suggest "that adults have lost the joy of childhood, and with it an understanding of the divine nature of creation." Traherne seems to convey the idea that paradise can be rediscovered and regained only through reacquiring this childlike innocence—a state which "precedes the knowledge of good and evil" and seems to be composed of a boundless love and wonder.

In this respect, Traherne's work is often compared to the abounding joy and mysticism found in the works of William Blake, Walt Whitman, and Gerard Manley Hopkins. According to Traherne scholar Denise Inge, Traherne's introduction of a child's viewpoint to narrate his theological and moral premises was unknown or certainly unappreciated in the literature of this time.

=== Happiness ===
Achieving happiness is another focus of Traherne's work. He wrote "I will first spend a great deal of time in seeking Happiness, and then a great deal more in enjoying it." He wrote that many people despise happiness, but that "Heaven is a place where our happiness shall be seen of all. We shall there enjoy the happiness of being seen in happiness, without the danger of ostentation."

=== Practical philosophy ===
Traherne was intent that insights gained through philosophy be used in daily life.

== Legacy ==
Traherne's works remained largely unpublished until their publication at the start of the 20th century. Those who have acknowledged an influence since then have been the Trappist monk Thomas Merton; the Christian humanist Dorothy L. Sayers; the poet Elizabeth Jennings; and C. S. Lewis, who called Centuries of Meditations "almost the most beautiful book in English".

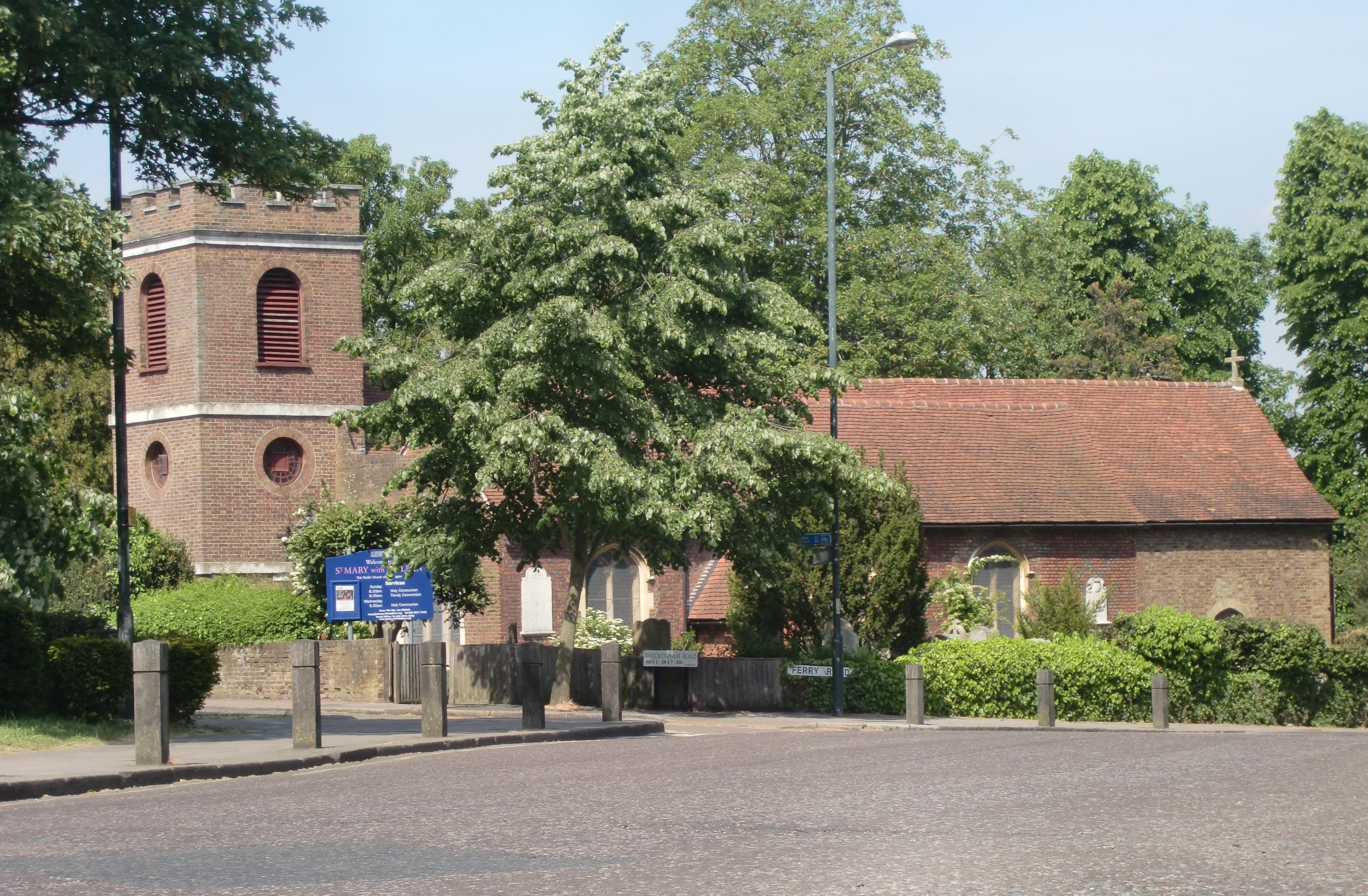
Traherne was interred at St Mary's Church, Teddington, Middlesex.

They also had their influence within the Anglican Communion which, though it does not create saints in the same way as in the Roman Catholic tradition, has frequently canonised people of great holiness, sometimes by a formal process and sometimes by popular acclamation or local custom. Following this precedent, and in commemoration of his poems and spiritual writings, Thomas Traherne is included in the Calendar of Saints in many national churches within the Anglican Communion. He is remembered in the Church of England with a commemoration.

The commemoration of Traherne is held on either 27 September (the date of his death) or 10 October (the date of his burial).

Observed on 10 October Church of England; Anglican Church of Korea; Hong Kong Sheng Kung Hui (also known as the Hong Kong Anglican Church)

== A century of musical settings ==
It has been observed of Traherne that "more than any other form of art, if one may judge from the frequency and fervor of the references, Traherne loved music", that this was of long standing and life-long. The Traherne Association has compiled a check list of some hundred composers who have recognised the lyrical power of his writing and set words by him to music. Several of these are from the poet's native Herefordshire, while a significant proportion come from other countries and not all from the English-speaking world. There have also been a wide variety of musical styles over the past century, from art song to devotional motets, from advanced modernism to minimalism, and there have been some purely instrumental interpretations as well.

=== Britain ===
The earliest known setting was by Welsh-born Bryceson Treharne (1879–1948). His "Invocation" of 1917 was stanza 11 of an untitled poem in Traherne's Christian Ethicks: "O holy Jesus who didst for us die", set for baritone and piano. It was followed in 1924 by Rutland Boughton's "Contentment", a part-song for unaccompanied men's voices which sets Traherne's "Contentment is a sleepy thing", also from Christian Ethicks. Later composers set both verse and prose for singing within the same work, of which one example from 1978 was Elizabeth Maconchy's cycle "Sun, Moon and Stars" for soprano and piano.

It was in the 1920s that Gerald Finzi began work on his ambitious Dies natalis, a cantata for high solo voice and string orchestra. Only completed in 1939, the work's premiere was cancelled due to the outbreak of the Second World War, and it was not performed until some months later in January 1940. Its purely instrumental "Intrada" is followed by a section of prose passages from the third in his Centuries of Meditations, and then by three poems: "The Rapture", "Wonder" and "The Salutation". The texts chosen reflect the joy and wonder of a newborn child's innocent perspective and wonderment at a world of such beauty.

Given Traherne's calling and piety, many modern settings of Traherne's work have a devotional context. His poem "The Rapture" was included in the Cambridge Hymnal (1967) as Hymn 97, with music by the composer William Wordsworth. Also among the largely sacred choral music of Patrick Larley has been his On Christmas Day (2002), a sequence of seven pieces, of which numbers 1, 3 and 7 incorporate verses from Traherne's poem "On Christmas-Day". Several other pieces were commissioned for special occasions: from Colin Matthews ("Shadows in the water", 1978/9); Francis Jackson ("On Christmas Day", 1995); John Casken ("A song of Chimes", 1996); Andrew Carter ("The saints of God", 2005); Cecilia McDowall, ("The skies in their magnificence", 2008); Francis Pott, ("The love of God is in eternity", 2011); and David Sawer, ("Wonder", 2012).

=== International ===
Sawer's choral work was written to celebrate the Diamond Jubilee of Elizabeth II. Earlier, Toivo Tulev (born 1958) had set lines from Traherne's Centuries of Meditations as "Rejoice! Rejoice! Rejoice!" for a performance in honour of the queen's state visit to Estonia in October 2006. Other settings of Traherne's work have been made by Bulgarian-born Dobrinka Tabakova ("Centuries of Meditations", selections set for full choir, harp or piano and strings, 2012); by the French Claude Ballif, (Poème de la félicité for three female voices, 1977); and by the Finnish Jouni Kaipainen, whose "Felicity and Fullnesse" is described as a monodrama for high baritone and orchestra in which verses by Traherne alternate with verses by Hanno Eskola (2006).

In North America, the Canadian composer Frederick Karam (1926–1978) wrote "From Dust I Rise", an anthem based on lines from Traherne's poem "The Salutation", first performed in 1958. In the United States, Anthony Piccolo wrote "Wonder", with lyrics from Traherne's poem of the same title, for medium-high voice and piano in 1987; Aaron Jay Kernis set the song cycle "Two Awakenings and a Lullaby" for soprano, violin, guitar and piano in 2006; Bob Chilcott set "The sun and stars are mine" for high voices and piano in 2012; and Garrett George composed "4 Traherne Songs" for soprano with piano accompaniment in 2018.

=== Instrumental and other formats ===
Two Japanese works by Satoru Ikeda (born 1961) have taken their beginning from Traherne's "The Salutation". The first was a vocalic transposition of the English text for chamber choir, accordion, tuba and harp, in which the instruments "are symbols of Heaven, Earth, and Man" (2003). Later the composer wrote a purely instrumental work for alto flute which was divided into three movements (Abyss, Awakening and Apparition), inspired by three stanzas from the poem (2015). Another interpretation of Traherne for full orchestra was Australian composer Nigel Butterley's Meditations of Thomas Traherne (1968), based on five prose meditations.

Two organ works have been inspired by Tom Denny's Traherne windows in the Audley chapel in Hereford Cathedral. In addition, American Peter Stoltzfus Berton (born 1968) based the fifteen pieces in his "Hereford Variations" (2007) on Traherne's Centuries of Meditations. Martin Bussey's organ work "Hereford Windows" followed in 2014.

Traherne's writing has also contributed to two larger-scale works. Kenneth Leighton's Symphony No.2 (Sinfonia mistica, 1974) set lines from Traherne's "Thanksgivings for the Body" as its third movement (Meditation). Later, Harrison Birtwistle had Christ quote from "Thanksgivings for the Body" in Vision 1 of his opera The Last Supper (1999).

Lying outside the classical music tradition, the Incredible String Band's piece "Douglas Traherne Harding" on the Wee Tam and the Big Huge album (1968) incorporated lines from Centuries of Meditations and demonstrates the wide versatility of application of which Traherne's work has been capable.

== Works and publications ==
=== Published during Traherne's life and times ===
- 1673: Roman Forgeries, Or, A True Account of False Records Discovering the Impostures and Counterfeit Antiquities of the Church of Rome (London: Printed by S. & B. Griffin for Jonathan Edwin, 1673).
- 1675: Christian Ethicks: Or, Divine Morality. Opening the Way to Blessedness, By the Rules of Vertue and Reason (London: Printed for Jonathan Edwin, 1675).
- 1699: A Serious and Pathetical Contemplation of the Mercies of God, In Several Most Devout and Sublime Thanksgivings for the same (London: Printed for Samuel Keble, 1699).
- 1717: Meditations on the Creation, in A Collection of Meditations and Devotions, in Three Parts. (London: Published by Nathaniel Spinkes. Printed for D. Midwinter, 1717).

=== Later compilations and editions ===
- 1903: Traherne, Thomas (1903). Dobell, Bertram (ed.). The Poetical Works of Thomas Traherne 1636?–1674. London: Dobell. A second edition appeared in 1906.
- 1905: Traherne, Thomas; Vaughn, Thomas; Norris, John (1905). Selected poems by Thomas Traherne, English verse-remains by Thomas Vaughan, selected poems by John Norris. Hull: J.R.Tutin.
- 1908: Traherne, Thomas (1908). Dobell, Bertram (ed.). Centuries of Meditations. London: Dobell.
- 1910 Traherne, Thomas (1910). Bell, H.I. (ed.). Traherne's Poems of Felicity. Oxford: Clarendon Press.
- 1932: The Poetical Works of Thomas Traherne, faithfully reprinted from the Author's Original Manuscript, together with Poems of Felicity, reprinted from the Burney manuscript, and Poems from Various Sources (edited by Gladys I. Wade) (London: P. J. & A. E. Dobell, 1932).
- 1941: A Serious and Pathetical Contemplation of the Mercies of God, In Several most Devout and Sublime Thanksgivings for the same (edited by Roy Daniells) (Toronto: University of Toronto Press, 1941).
- 1958: Centuries, Poems, and Thanksgivings 2 volumes (edited by H. M. Margoliouth) (Oxford: Clarendon Press, 1958).
- 1966: Meditations on the Six Days of the Creation (edited by George Robert Guffey) (Los Angeles: William Andrews Clark Memorial Library, University of California, 1966).
- 1966: Poems, Centuries, and Three Thanksgivings (edited by Anne Ridler) (London: Oxford University Press, 1966).
- 1968: Christian Ethicks (edited by Carol L. Marks and Guffey) (Ithaca: Cornell University Press, 1968).
- 1989: Commentaries of Heaven: The Poems (edited by D. D. C. Chambers) (Salzburg: Institut für Anglistik und Amerikanistik Universitat Salzburg, 1989). ISBN 9780773405844
- 2005–2017: Traherne, Thomas (18 June 2020). Ross, Jan (ed.). The Works of Thomas Traherne. Melton, Suffolk, UK: D.S.Brewer. ISBN 9781843840473.
  - Volume I: Inducements to Retirednes, A Sober View of Dr Twisses his Considerations, Seeds of Eternity or the Nature of the Soul, The Kingdom of God (2005). ISBN 9781843840374
  - Volume II: Commentaries of Heaven, part 1: Abhorrence to Alone (2007) ISBN 9781843841357
  - Volume III: Commentaries of Heaven, part 2: Al-Sufficient to Bastard (2007) ISBN 9781843841364
  - Volume IV: Church's Year-Book, A Serious and Pathetical Contemplation of the Mercies of GOD, [Meditations on the Six Days of the Creation] (2009) ISBN 9781843841968
  - Volume V: Centuries of Meditations and Select Meditations (2013) ISBN 9781843843276
  - Volume VI: Verse: from the Dobell Folio, Poems of Felicity, The Ceremonial Law ISBN 9781843843825
  - Volume VII: Roman Forgeries, Christian Ethicks: or, Divine Morality ISBN 9781843846185
  - Volume. VIII: Commentary and Index (not yet published)
  - Volume IX: Notebooks (not yet published)
- 2023: Traherne, Thomas. Redemer, Colin (ed). Christian Ethics, Modernized. Landrum, South Carolina, US. (Davenant Press, 2023)
  - Volume 1: The Shining Human Creature (2023). ISBN 9781949716160
  - Volume 2: Made Like the Maker (2023). ISBN 9781949716214

=== Translations ===
- Poèmes de la félicité, trans. Jean Wahl, Éditions du Seuil, Paris 1951; some originally appeared in the magazine Mesures in April 1936
- Les Centuries, trans. Magali Jullien, Arfuyen, 2011
- Robert Jones' "That Cross is a Tree set on fire with invisible flame" (Das Kreuz ist ein flammender Baum), a setting for full choir and organ which draws its text from three of Thomas Traherne's Centuries; a German translation provided by Meik Impekoven. Published: Dr. J. Butz, Bonn, 2015.
- Goûter Dieu, trans. Magali Jullien, Arfuyen, 2020

== See also ==
- List of poetry groups and movements
- Metaphysical poetry
- Saints in Anglicanism
