= Wang Zhiming (pastor) =

Miao pastor

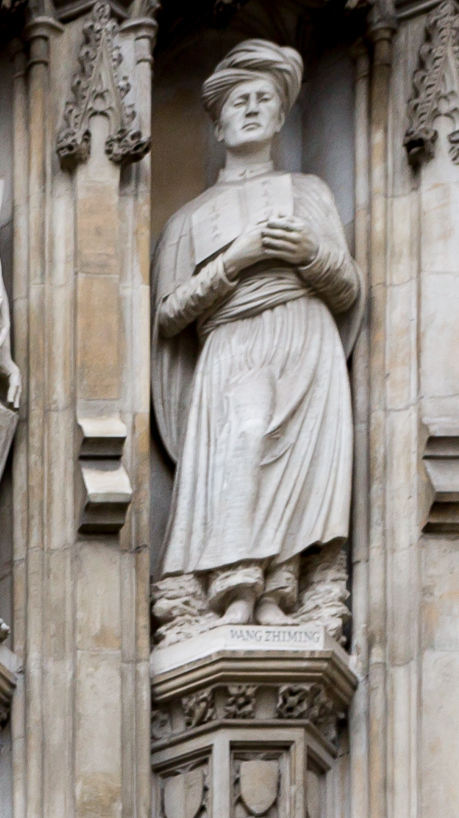
Wang Zhiming is commemorated as one of the Modern Martyrs of the 20th century above the west door of Westminster Abbey.

Wang Zhiming (王志明) (1907 – December 29, 1973) was a Miao pastor from Wuding County, Yunnan, who was executed on December 29, 1973, during the Cultural Revolution.

== Life and work ==
Wang Zhiming was born in Wuding in 1907, the year after Christian missionaries Samuel Pollard, Arthur G. Nicholls, George E. Metcalf and Gladstone Porteous first began work there. Their work among minority people, especially the Miao in Wuding, saw much fruit. By 1949, 130,000 Protestants, nearly 20% of the total for China, were found among Yunnan's minorities. Five years later half of the Christians in Yunnan reportedly lived in the prefecture which included Wuding.

Wang was educated in Christian schools and later taught in one for ten years. In 1944 he was elected chairman of the church council in Wuding, and he was ordained in 1951 at the age of 44. During the 1950s Wang was one of six Miao Christian leaders who accommodated some of the demands of the new government by signing the Three Self Manifesto. Still, he refused to participate in denunciation meetings held to humiliate landlords, saying, "My hands have baptized many converts, and should not be used for sinfulness". This was undoubtedly one of the reasons that, even before the Cultural Revolution, Wang was declared a counter-revolutionary.

== Martyrdom ==
During the Cultural Revolution (1966–1976), at least 21 Christian leaders in Wuding were imprisoned, and many others were sent to camps, denounced or beaten. Muslims in the area were also targeted. One of the interned Christians later stated:

I cannot recall how many times I was made to kneel on the rubble and how much blood flowed from my knees due to their sharp edges. When I could not hold out and fell to the ground, merciless beatings followed. Then I was pulled up and forced to salute the portrait of Chairman Mao. My refusal to do so resulted in another round of beating up. Vicious cycles went on and on. This only paused for a little while when I almost lost consciousness.

— Li Zicheng, in Ju-K'ang T'ien, Peaks of Faith, page 115

In 1969, Wang Zhiming and his wife and sons were arrested. On December 29, 1973, Wang was executed in a stadium in front of more than 10,000 people. Zhiming's execution caused chaos to break out in the largely Christian audience, and the prosecuting officials were assaulted by spectators.

== Legacy ==
After the Cultural Revolution, official attempts to placate the Miao included a compensatory payment of 1,300 yuan (then $250) to Wang's family. His execution did not end the spread of Christianity in the area: when Wang Zhiming was arrested, there were 2,795 Christians in Wuding; by 1980 the church had grown to about 12,000, and Wuding now has over 30,000 Christians and more than 100 places of worship. Sporadic persecution in Wuding continues.

In 1981, a large monument was erected at his gravesite.

In 1998, he was one of ten 20th-century Christian martyrs memorialized above the Great West Door of Westminster Abbey with a statue.

In 2014, a documentary about Wang's life and community was released by filmmaker Hu Jie.
