= Maqhamusela Khanyile =

Maqhamusela Khanyile (c 1850 - 1877) was the first South African Christian martyr.

== Background ==
Khanyile lived in Zululand at the time of King Cetshwayo. Cetshwayo's predecessor King Shaka devised the ibutho system as the centre pillar of the Zulu state. Young men were required to serve as soldiers until they were about 30 years old, after which they were allowed to marry. A conversation between King Cetshwayo and the Norwegian missionary, Rev JL Kyllingstad in 1876 was recorded as follows:

But look here, Umfundisi (teacher) We cannot permit that our soldiers run to the school and become believers; because then they are running away from the King's service, and we lose our army. The believers are of no use to us and never serve us, as they are lost to us and the service when they attend school. We must refuse permission for you to take them away from us and do not permit that a soldier should become a believer.

Zulu state power was based on this system of conscription. From puberty until late their 30s, men worked for the king. People were allowed to live, study and work at mission stations, and to embark on the process to conversion to Christianity, but the final step of baptism was not accepted by the Zulu chiefs and kings.

Khanyile lived near the Norwegian Mission Society (NMS) station at Eshowe, the Zulu people named the mission uMondi after Ommund Oftebro, the superintendent of the NMS. On the day before Khanyile's death, Oftebro informed him that he had an audience with King Cetshwayo in order to obtain the king's permission to baptise Khanyile. Cetshwayo declined to give his permission before consulting with the local chief.

Khanyile knew that his life was in danger and he said to Oftebro:

If he now has me killed, I will rejoice in it. I am not afraid. Is it not good to die for Christs name Did he not die for me He will give me a little place in his kingdom up there.

== Martyrdom ==
Khanyile was shot on a hillside outside Eshowe on 9 March 1877, becoming the first South African Christian martyr. Du Plessis reported in A History of Christian Missions in South Africa

At Eshowe in 1877 a party of warriors approached Maqhamusela and told him he was to be killed. Why, the old man asked. “Because you are a learner, and would be baptised,” they replied.

“It is well,” said Maqhamusela, “but let me first pray.” He knelt down and prayed. Then, rising to his feet, he said: “Now I am ready. Slay me.”

As the spears pierced him, a thunderstorm cracked. Many Zulu folk took this as a sign of God’s anger with Cetewayo, and the result of Maqhamusela’s martyrdom was that their faith grew despite further persecution.

This incident became another reason for the British invasion of the Zulu Kingdom in 1879.

== Commemoration ==
The Anglican Church of Southern Africa commemorates Khanyile in its Calendar of saints on the 9th day of March each year. In addition the collect for this commemoration is as follows:

God our strength and our redeemer
your servant Maqhamusela of Zululand
chose to suffer insults, persecution and death
rather than betray your Son:
grant that we your disciples may follow you with allour hearts
and that nothing may separate us from you;
through Jesus Christ our Lord, Amen

In 1926, a committee chaired by K. S. Zungu and Reverend L. O. Aadnesgaard started to collect funds to put up a memorial to Khanyile. The man in charge of the eShowe mission, Reverend S. Solberg, designed the monument to be erected on Mpondweni hill close to the place where the execution had taken place.

The Norwegian missionary, Rev'd P. A. Rodseth interviewed many people about the life and death of Khanyile and he reported his findings in The South African Church Weekly Newsletter of 3 March 1937.

In 1939, they erected a concrete cross on Mpondweni hill. (28.904919°S 31.497212°E) The inscription read:

At this place Maqhamusela Khanyile died before his time, believing in Christ.

In 1951, the Lutheran Bible School was named after Khanyile and on 3 March 1981 a new cross of steel replaced the concrete cross.

The Premier of KwaZulu-Natal and the Evangelical Lutheran Church in Southern Africa arranged a commemoration celebration on kwaMondi on 11 March 2007. The Premier of KwaZulu-Natal, Sbu Ndebele unveiled the new monument on 11 March 2007. (Note: A dispute has broken out over the condition of the monument to Maqhamusela Khanyile. Because the memorial has been vandalised, earlier this year Amafa CEO Barry Marshall asked uThungulu District Council mayor Stan Larkan to remove the damaged cross until such time that a decision could be made about its future. Last week, Premier Sbu Ndebele accused Larkan of desecrating the memorial, and Larkan has demanded an apology for what he feels is an unwarranted attack.)

== Sources ==
- Nürnberger, Margarete Paula Luise (2000), "A Zulu martyr? : what are the factors that led to the sparse and irregular public commemoration on Maqhamusela Khanyile in the Lutheran church to which he belonged?" (PDF), Rhodes eResearch Repository
- Knight, Ian (2011). Zulu Rising: The Epic Story of iSandlwana and Rorke's Drift. Pan Macmillan. ISBN 978-1-4472-0223-3.
- Hale, Frederick (1996). Norwegian Missionaries in Natal and Zululand: Selected Correspondence 1844-1900. Van Riebeeck Society, The. ISBN 978-0-9584112-3-3.
- du Plessis, J. (1911). A History of Christian Missions in South Africa. Longmans, Green and co.
- Plathow, Michael (2007). Lutherische Kirchen (in German). Vandenhoeck & Ruprecht. ISBN 978-3-525-87120-1.
- Werner, Alice (1933). "Colenso of Natal". International Review of Mission. 22 (4): 510–521. doi:10.1111/j.1758-6631.1933.tb04758.x. ISSN 0020-8582.
- Nürnberger, Margarete (2001). "Maqhamusela Khanyile's life and testimony" (PDF). Natalia. 31. Natal Society Foundation: 34–52.
- Cubbin, Tony (1988). "Maqhamusela Khanyile: First Christian Martyr of the Norwegian Lutheran Mission Society", Zululand Historical Society,
- van der Walt, J.C. (12 Mar 2009). "Remembering a martyr". The Witness.
- Kristin Fjelde Tjelle, ed. (30 March 2007). "Martyr commemoration in South Africa". Mission Archives.
- Sibusiso Ndebele (11 March 2007). "Ndebele: Martyrdom of M Khanyile commemoration". Polity.org.za.
