= Janani Luwum =

Ugandan archbishop (1922 - 1977)

- Archbishop of the Church of Uganda; Primate of the Anglican Church in Uganda
- Church: Anglican Communion
- See: Kampala
- In office: 1974–1977
- Predecessor: Erica Sabiti
- Successor: Silvanus Wani
- Previous posts: Anglican Church Province of northern Uganda, Archbishop of the Metropolitan Province of Uganda, Rwanda, Burundi and Boga-Zaire; Bishop

Orders
- Ordination: 1953

Personal details
- Born: c. 1922 Kitgum District, British Uganda
- Died: 16 February 1977 (aged 55) Kampala, Second Republic of Uganda
- Spouse: Mary Luwum (died 2019 at 93 years)

Janani Jakaliya Luwum was a Ugandan Anglican bishop. He was the archbishop of the Church of Uganda from 1974 to 1977 and one of the most influential leaders of the modern church in Africa. He was arrested in February 1977 and died shortly after. Although the official account describes a car crash, it is generally accepted that he was murdered on the orders of then-president Idi Amin.

Since 2015, Uganda has a public holiday on 16 February to celebrate the life of Luwum.

== Early life ==
Luwum was born in the village of Mucwini in the Kitgum District to Acholi parents. He attended Gulu High School and Boroboro Teacher Training College, after which he taught at a primary school. Luwum converted to Christianity in 1948, and in 1949 he went to Buwalasi Theological College.

== Career ==
In 1950 he was attached to St. Philip's Church in Gulu. He was ordained a deacon in 1953, and the following year he was ordained a priest. He served in the Upper Nile Diocese of Uganda and later in the Diocese of Mbale. In 1969 he was consecrated Bishop of the Diocese of Northern Uganda at Gulu. After five years he was appointed Archbishop of the Metropolitan Province of Uganda, Rwanda, Burundi, and Boga (in Zaire), becoming the second African to hold this position.

== Arrest and death ==
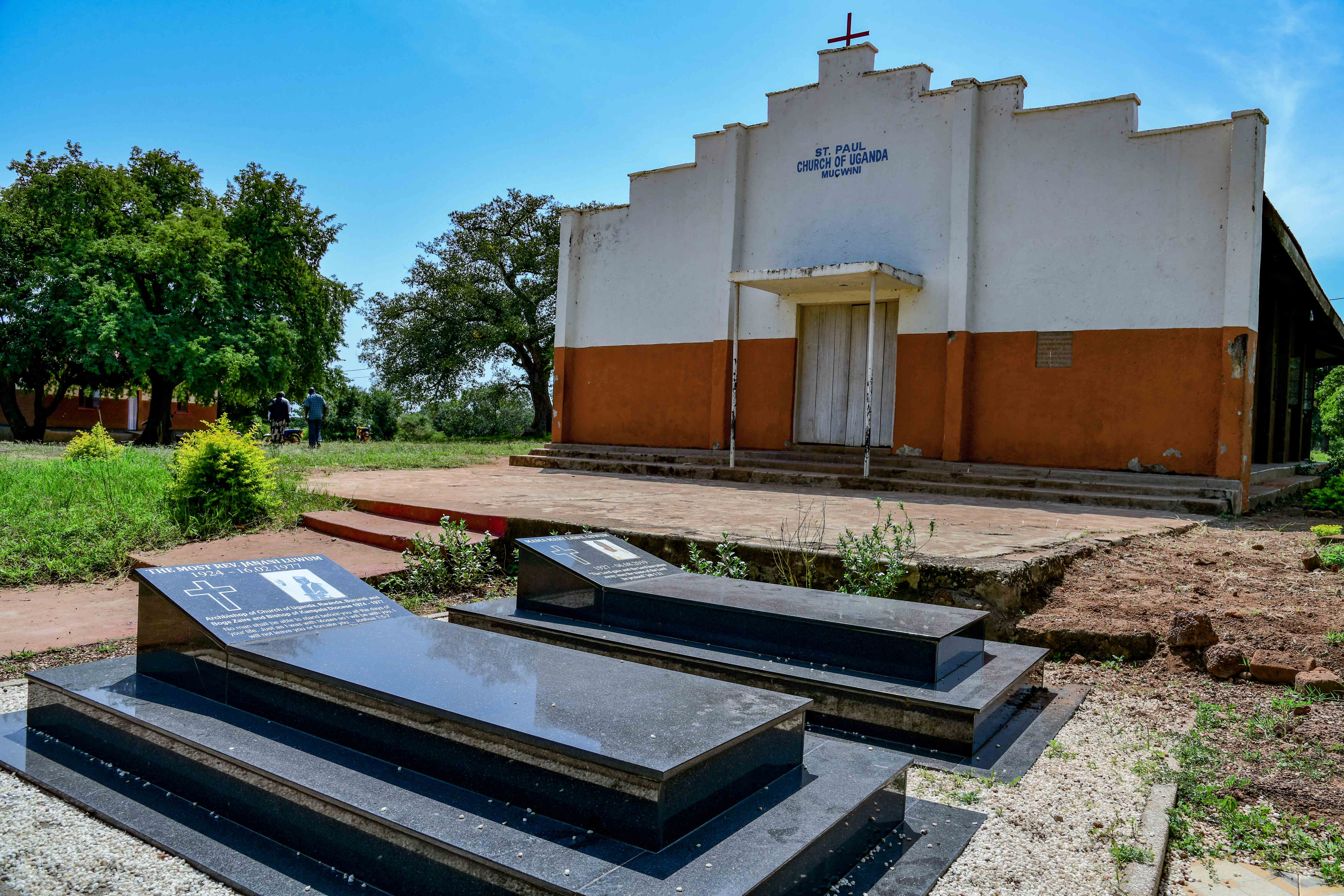
Archbishop Janan Luwum and Mary Luwum (spouse) burial site in Kitgum in 2022

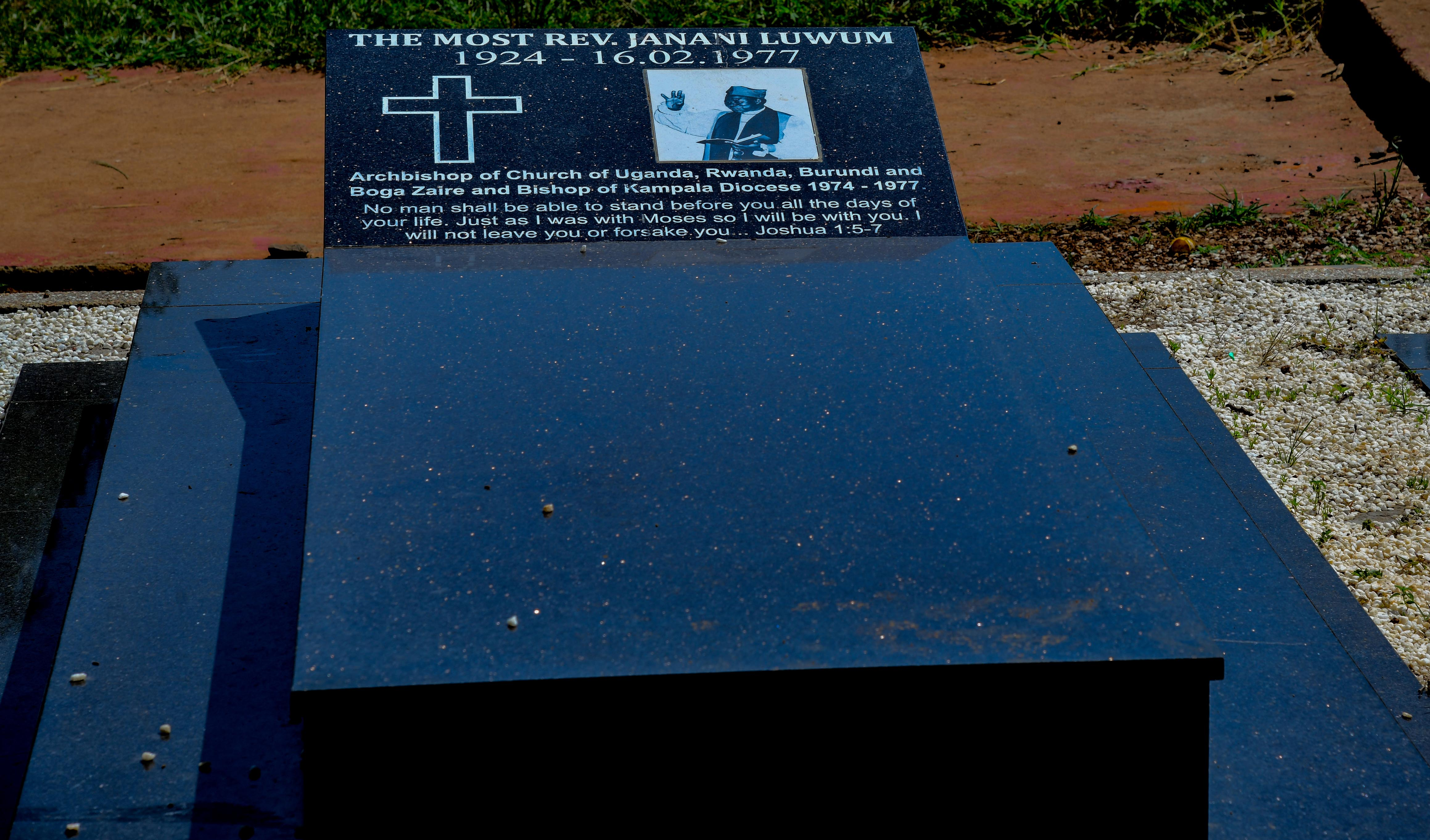
Janan Luwum's grave in Kitgum, Uganda

Archbishop Luwum was a leading voice in criticising the excesses of the Idi Amin regime that assumed power in 1971. In 1977, Archbishop Luwum delivered a note of protest to dictator Idi Amin against the policies of arbitrary killings and unexplained disappearances. Shortly afterwards the archbishop and other leading churchmen were accused of treason.

On 16 February 1977, Luwum was arrested together with two cabinet ministers, Erinayo Wilson Oryema and Charles Oboth Ofumbi. The same day Idi Amin convened a rally in Kampala with the three accused present. A few other "suspects" were paraded forth to read out "confessions" implicating the three men. The archbishop was accused of being an agent of the exiled former president Milton Obote, and for planning to stage a coup. The next day, Radio Uganda announced that the three had been killed when the car transporting them to an interrogation centre had collided with another vehicle. The accident, Radio Uganda reported, had occurred when the victims had tried to overpower the driver in an attempt to escape. When Luwum's body was released to his relatives, it was riddled with bullets. Henry Kyemba, minister of health in Amin's government, later wrote in his book A State of Blood, that "The bodies were bullet-riddled. The archbishop had been shot through the mouth and at least three bullets in the chest. The ministers had been shot in a similar way but one only in the chest and not through the mouth. Oryema had a bullet wound through the leg."

According to the later testimony of witnesses, the victims had been taken to an army barracks, where they were bullied, beaten and finally shot. Time magazine said "Some reports even had it that Amin himself had pulled the trigger, but Amin angrily denied the charge, and there were no first-hand witnesses". According to Vice President of Uganda Mustafa Adrisi and a Human rights commission, Amin's right-hand man Isaac Maliyamungu carried out the murder of Luwum and his colleagues.

== Legacy ==
Janani Luwum was survived by his widow, Mary Lawinyo Luwum and nine children. He was buried at his home village of Mucwini in the Kitgum District. Archbishop Luwum is recognized as a martyr by the Anglican Communion and his statue is among the Twentieth Century Martyrs on the front of Westminster Abbey in London. He is honored on the liturgical calendars of the Anglican Church of Australia, Anglican Church of Canada, Scottish Episcopal Church, and Church in Wales on 3 June. He is honored on the liturgical calendars of the Anglican Church in Aotearoa, New Zealand and Polynesia, Episcopal Anglican Church of Brazil, Church of England and the Episcopal Church of the United States on 17 February.

=== Archbishop Janani Luwum Day ===
Archbishop Janani Luwum Day is a public holiday in Uganda, celebrated 16 February annually. The holiday is dedicated to the life and service of Janani Luwum, the former archbishop of the Anglican Church of Uganda, who is typically regarded as having been murdered on the orders of the then-President Idi Amin.

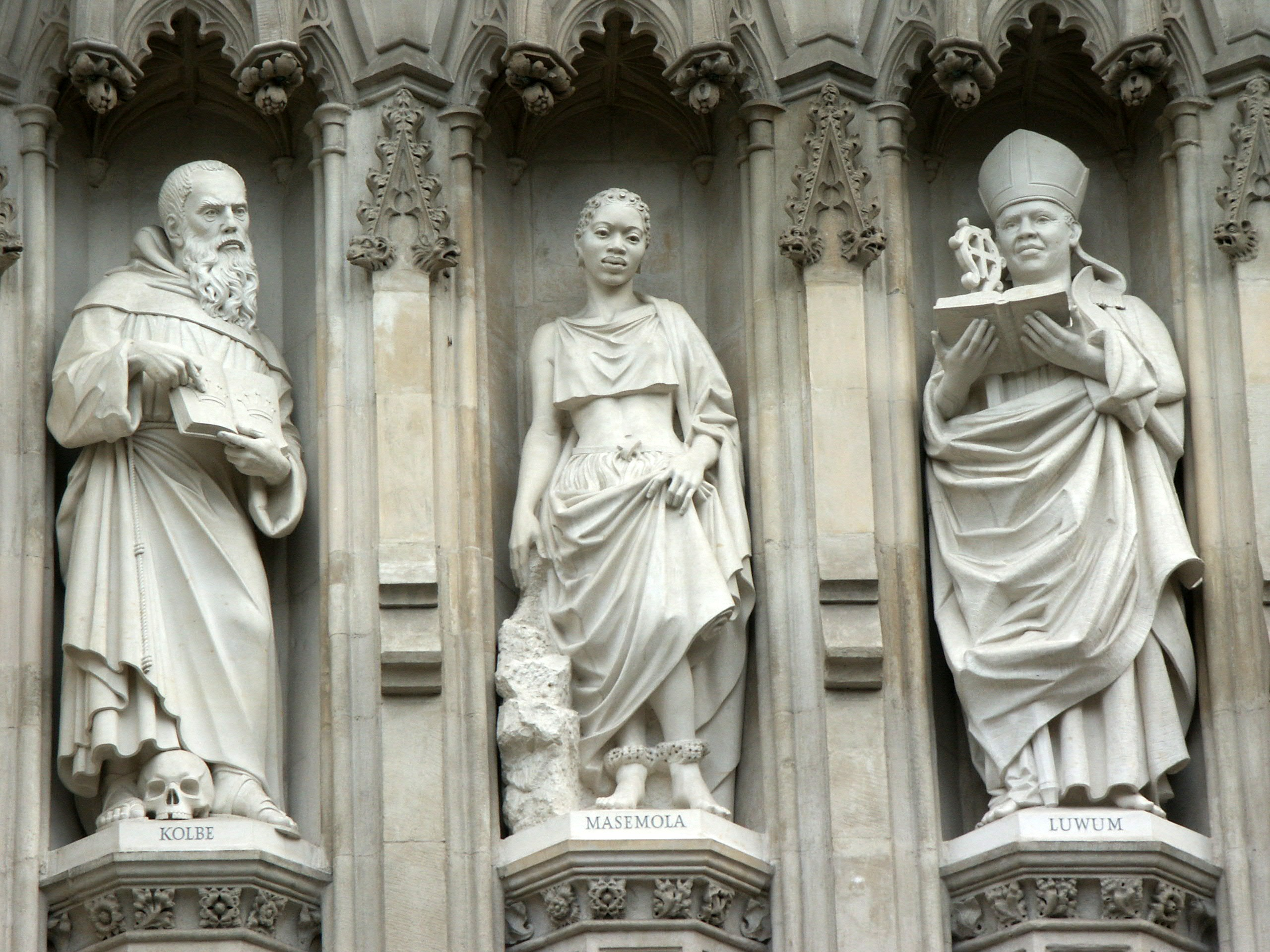
Maximilian Kolbe (left), Manche Masemola (centre) and Luwum (right) statues – Westminster Abbey

== See also ==
- Bishop of Uganda
- Namirembe

Anglican Communion titles
Preceded by Erica Sabiti as Archbishop	Archbishop of Uganda and Bishop of Kampala as Archbishop; 1974–1977	Succeeded by Silvanus Wani as Archbishop
