= Arthur G. Nicholls =

Australian medical missionary of British nationality

Arthur G. Nicholls, Chinese name 郭秀峰 Guō Xiùfēng, (1879-1956) was an Australian medical missionary of British nationality to the Miao people of Yunnan Province in China.

He was one of the China Inland Mission group which followed Samuel Pollard in South West China. Nicholls arrived in China in 1894 and lost his wife in 1903. In 1906 he was sent to study in Shimenkan. He had as colleagues in Yunnan Gladstone Porteous and his wife and George E. Metcalf. Pollard arranged for Nicholls to settle at Sapushan after some of the Christian Miao from Guizhou had made contact with relatives there.

After Nicholls left in 1944 Wang Zhiming (commemorated among the ten 1998 Westminster Abbey martyrs statues) took charge of the church work in Wuding, Luquan, Fumin, Yuanmou and Lufeng, four villages with some 400 people.
