= Gladstone Porteous =

Australian missionary

Gladstone Charles Fletcher Porteous, Chinese name 張爾昌 Zhāng Ěrchāng (1874–1944), was an Australian missionary to China who served with the China Inland Mission from 1904 and became Superintendent of the work in East Yunnan. He was a skilled Bible translator, devised the romanized Yi alphabet, and translated parts of the New Testament into several Chinese dialects.

== Early life ==
Gladstone Porteous was born in Carngham, Victoria, Australia in 1874, the son of John Dempsey-Porteous, who had emigrated to Australia with his parents from Glasgow, Scotland, and Catherine Fletcher of Sandon, Victoria. Porteous was an Australian missionary to China who devised the romanized Yi alphabet, and translated the Bible into the Yi language. After training at Rehoboth Missionary College, Richmond, Victoria, he sailed for China in 1904. In 1906 he was appointed to the mission station at Sapushan, working amongst the Miao people, during which time he began to learn Chinese. He continued in this work for many years, his medical experience enabling him to be instrumental in the treatment and recovery of many sick people.

Known to his friends as "Gladdie" Porteous, he was one of the young Australians who came to China following the death of James Bruce in western Hunan province in August 1902 aged 30. The influence of this group of Australian missionaries in Yunnan was profound – though one story is incorrect: they did not introduce the eucalyptus trees into the Luquan District. These had been in Yunnan since the 1850s, and may have been brought back by Chinese miners after the Australian goldrush for use as railway sleepers.

== Ministry in Yunnan ==
Porteous arrived in Yunnan in 1907 with Arthur G. Nicholls (郭秀峯) and George E. Metcalf (王懷仁). One of the main influences was the theological school run by Porteous. Another was the location, since Sayingpan (撒营盘镇), 80 km north of the county seat of Luquan, was the original site of Salaowu (撒老乌), chief fortress of the Yi.

He was joined by his wife, Minnie (née Pearson) from England, whom he married in 1908. Together they ministered to the people of Yunnan, and eventually moved three days travel to the north to work amongst the Nosu people at Salaowu, where their fruitful ministry continued for over twenty years. A talented linguist, Porteous set about translating parts of the Bible into at least three separate Chinese dialects, in collaboration with Nicholls. These included the Gospel of Mark in the Laqua language (spoken by a people group in south-western China (1912); the Gospel of Matthew in the Hmong language – spoken in western Guizhou Province of China and as far southward as Vietnam and Laos – together with Samuel Pollard, who was responsible for devising the syllabic script used for the Miao dialects and its related languages); and the New Testament in the Nusu language (spoken from Sichuan Province to the south of Yunnan – Gospel of St Luke, 1923; Acts of the Apostles, 1926; New Testament, 1948). His assistant in the Yi language translation and among the Yi people was Li Faxian (李發獻).

== Death and legacy ==
Gladstone and Minnie Porteous had three children: Ruth Catherine, Christine Olive, and Stanley John (who was killed in action during World War II serving with the RAAF). One of his grandsons is the Australian actor and scriptwriter Shane Porteous, best known as Dr. Terence Elliot in television's A Country Practice. One his great grand daughters is radio presenter Jo Stanley.

Gladstone Porteous died of Typhus in Salaowu (also known as Sayingpan) on 10 November 1944. A tombstone was erected by local church members; "When our father died, a large slab of stone was cut by the people and the surface polished by the exhausting but surprisingly effective method of dragging the slab back and forth against another rock. Then the pastor chiselled out an inscription in three languages – English, Nuosu and Chinese, and the stone was erected by the Christians above the grave." At his death 20,000 of the Yi and Miao were Christians. Today (2011) there are 40,000 Christians and each valley is marked by white-towered churches.

His tombstone was destroyed during the Cultural Revolution and a new one later placed where the site of the grave was presumed to be, a location that was disputed by some of the older villagers, to show when Australians again visited Sayingpan in the late 1990s.

== China Candid ==
In two collections of oral history there are interviews with Yi and Miao villagers which in passing recount various tales about Gladstone Porteous. However Porteous' English name was not widely remembered by the villagers, and in the translation of interviews found in Jacqueline Lo's Writing Home (2000) and in journalist Sang Ye's collection of oral history China Candid (2006) the English translation of his Chinese name Zhang Erchang (张尔昌) incorrectly uses the name "John Williams." The confusion may arise from a conflation of the John Williams (missionary) who famously was eaten by cannibals on Vanuatu, with another John Williams, a radio operator with General Claire Lee Chennault's Flying Tigers who was stationed in Kunming at the same time as Porteous was 100 km further North at Sayingpan. – misnamed as John Williams.

== Bibliography ==
- Annual report of the American Bible Society (American Bible Society, 1949), p. 133.
- Bailey, Ruth Porteous, and Porteous, Christine. Gladstone Porteous – China Missionary. In The Porteous Story, Porteous Associates, Kingston, Ontario, Canada, 1975), p. 190.
- Broomhall, Marshall. The Jubilee Story of the China Inland Mission (China Inland Mission, 1915), p. 386.
- China's Millions (China Inland Mission, October 1904; 1906).
- Clarke, Samuel R. Among the Tribes in South-West China (China Inland Mission, 1911), p. 315.
- Cook, Elinor Violet May. Fijian diary, 1904–1906: A Young Australian Woman's Account (1996), p. 189.
- Enwall, Joakim. A myth becomes Reality: History and Development of the Miao Written Language (Institute of Oriental Languages, Stockholm University, 1995), p. 241.
- Lo, Jacqueline. Writing Home, Chinese Australian Perspectives (Centre for the Southern Chinese Diaspora, Division of Pacific and Asian History, The Australian National University, 2000), p. 39.
- Sang, Ye (ed.). China Candid: The People on the People's Republic (University of California Press, 2006), p. 212.
- Strahan, Lachlan. Australia's China: Changing Perceptions from the 1930s to the 1990s (Cambridge University Press, 1996), p. 111.
