= Sam Pollard =

Sam Pollard may refer to:

- Sam Pollard (missionary) (1864–1915) British missionary to China
- Sam Pollard (filmmaker); American film director, editor, producer, and screenwriter
