= George E. Metcalf =

British Protestant missionary

George Edgar ‘Eddie’ Metcalf, Chinese name 王懷仁 Wáng Huáirén, (Birmingham, 1879-Melbourne, 1956) was a British Protestant missionary serving in China with the China Inland Mission and credited with the first translation of the New Testament for the Eastern Lisu/Lipo minority.

== UK ==
Metcalf was born in Warstone Lane, Birmingham, 3 March 1879, the third son of four brothers, born to Samuel and Emma Metcalf. He was converted in his late teens through the ministry of Revd Dr Luke Wiseman, a biographer of Charles Wesley. He trained as a tailor and had his own bespoke tailor’s shop in Oxford.

== China ==
Metcalf joined the China Inland Mission in 1906, arriving in Shanghai on 23 October. After a period of language study he travelled on foot, boat and horseback the length of China to Yunnan Province where he joined Arthur G. Nicholls of Sapushan and Gladstone Porteous of Sayingpan, working with a number of minority tribes in the province. The men adapted the Miao script developed by Samuel Pollard to translate portions of the Bible. Metcalf finally settled in Taku (Taogu) with the Eastern Lisu, establishing a church and Bible College.

On 19 January 1921 he married Elizabeth Mary Donnelly, an Australian missionary from Adelaide. Elizabeth was born on 19 January 1891 and arrived in China on 28 November 1917. See also Angus Murray (criminal) – brother of Elizabeth Mary Donnelly.

The couple had two children, Ruth (b. 24 June 1924, d. 18 January 2010), and Stephen (b. 23 October 1927, d. 7 June 2014), both of whom became missionaries with OMF International, Ruth Metcalf to Thailand, Stephen Metcalf to Japan.

In 1951 the Metcalfs were forced to leave China with the exodus of missionaries following the Communist victory over the Nationalist government. Metcalf did not live to know of the hardships of the Cultural Revolution which included the death in 1973 of his convert Pastor Wang Zhiming, whose statue is among those of the Ten 20th Century Martyrs on the West Gate of Westminster Abbey.

== New Testament translation ==
Metcalf completed his Eastern Lisu New Testament in 1947 and took his hand-written manuscript with him to Hong Kong. A second copy was left with the Eastern Lisu Church. This manuscript was lost in the subsequent suppression of the church by the Communist government. Metcalf’s translation was published in 1951, but no copies ever reached Yunnan. In 1999, Ruth Metcalf carried her father’s manuscript back to Yunnan and presented it to the Religious Affairs Bureau in Wuding. This was subsequently used in the preparation of a modern version of the New Testament in Eastern Lisu (Lipo), which was published in 2009.

== Australia ==
On retirement Eddie and Elizabeth settled in Australia. George Edgar Metcalf died in Melbourne on 15 January 1956. Elizabeth Mary (Donnelly) Metcalf died in Melbourne on 25 August 1966.
