= Calendar of saints (Church in Wales) =

Calendar of the Church in Wales

In the Calendar of the Church in Wales, each holy and saint's day listed has been assigned a number which indicates its category. Commemorations not included in this Calendar may be observed with the approval of the bishop.

== Category 1 ==
- The First Sunday of Advent: 27 November – 3 December
- The Second Sunday of Advent: 4–10 December
- The Third Sunday of Advent: 11–17 December
- The Fourth Sunday of Advent: 18–24 December
- Christmas Day: 25 December
- The (First) Sunday of Christmas: 26–31 December
- The Epiphany of our Lord: 6 January
- The Presentation of Christ: 2 February
- The Second Sunday before Lent, Creation Sunday
- The Sunday before Lent, Transfiguration Sunday
- Ash Wednesday
- The First Sunday of Lent (Invocabit)
- The Second Sunday of Lent (Reminiscence)
- The Third Sunday of Lent (Oculi)
- The Fourth Sunday of Lent, Mothering Sunday
- The Fifth Sunday of Lent, Passion Sunday
- The Sixth Sunday of Lent, Palm Sunday
- Monday, Tuesday and Wednesday of Holy Week
- Maundy Thursday
- Good Friday
- Easter Eve
- Easter Day
- Monday to Saturday of Easter Week
- The Second Sunday of Easter
- The Third Sunday of Easter
- The Fourth Sunday of Easter
- The Fifth Sunday of Easter
- The Sixth Sunday of Easter, Rogation Sunday
- The Ascension of our Lord: Thursday
- The Day of Pentecost
- Trinity Sunday
- The Last Sunday after Pentecost, Bible Sunday: 23–29 October
- All Saints' Day: 1 November
- The First Sunday of the Kingdom: 30 October – 5 November
- The Second Sunday of the Kingdom: 6–12 November
- The Third Sunday of the Kingdom: 13–19 November
- The Fourth Sunday of the Kingdom, Christ the King: 20–26 November

== Category 2 ==
- Christmas Eve: 24 December
- The Second Sunday of Christmas: 2–5 January (The Epiphany may be celebrated on this Sunday)
- The First (Second) Sunday of Epiphany, The Baptism of Christ: 7–13 January

== Category 3 ==
- The Second (Third) Sunday of Epiphany: 14–20 January
- The Third (Fourth) Sunday of Epiphany: 21–27 January
- The Fourth Sunday of Epiphany: 28 January – 1 February
- The Fifth Sunday before Lent
- The Fourth Sunday before Lent
- The Third Sunday before Lent
- Eastertide: Thanksgiving for Holy Baptism
- The Second to Twenty second Sundays after Pentecost

== Category 4 ==
- Rogation Days: Monday, Tuesday, and Wednesday
- Thursday: Thanksgiving for the Holy Communion

== Calendar ==
=== January ===
- 1 The Naming of Jesus
- 3 Morris Williams (1874), Priest and Poet
- 6 The Epiphany of our Lord
- 10 William Laud (1645), Bishop
- 11 Rhys Prichard (1644), Priest and Poet
- 11 William Williams (1791), Deacon and Poet
- 11 Isaac Williams (1865), Priest and Poet
- 13 Hilary (368), Bishop
- 14 Kentigern (c 603), Bishop
- 17 Antony (356), Abbot
- 18 The Confession of Peter, Apostle
- 21 Agnes (304), Virgin and Martyr
- 23 Francis de Sales (1622), Bishop
- 24 Cadoc (6th century), Abbot
- 25 The Conversion of Paul, Apostle
- 26 Timothy and Titus, Companions of Paul
- 27 John Chrysostom (407), Bishop and Doctor
- 28 Thomas Aquinas (1274), Doctor

=== February ===
- 1 Bride or Bridget (6th century), Abbess
- 2 The Presentation of Christ in the Temple (Candlemas)
- 3 The Saints, Martyrs and Missionaries of Europe
- 3 Seiriol (6th century), Abbot
- 4 Manche Masemola (1928), Martyr
- 9 Teilo (6th century), Bishop
- 14 Cyril (869), Monk and Missionary
- 14 Methodius (885), Bishop and Missionary
- 18 John of Fiesole (Fra Angelico) (1455), Priest, Religious and Painter
- 18 Andrei Rublev (c 1430), Religious, Painter
- 19 Thomas Burgess (1837), Bishop and Teacher of the Faith
- 20 The Saints, Martyrs and Missionaries of Africa
- 23 Polycarp (c 155), Bishop and Martyr
- 24 Matthias, Apostle
- 27 George Herbert (1633), Priest, and all Pastors

Ember Days: Wednesday, Friday and Saturday following Lent I

=== March ===
- 1 David (6th century), Bishop, Patron Saint of Wales
- 2 Chad, Bishop (672)
- 5 Non (5th century), Mother of David of Wales
- 7 Perpetua, Felicity and their Companions (203), Martyrs
- 9 Gregory of Nyssa, Bishop (395)
- 12 Gregory the Great (604), Bishop and Doctor
- 17 Patrick (5th century), Bishop, Patron Saint of Ireland
- 18 Cyril of Jerusalem (386), Bishop
- 19 Joseph of Nazareth
- 20 Cuthbert, Bishop (687)
- 21 Thomas Cranmer (1556), Bishop, Teacher of the Faith and Martyr
- 21 Hugh Latimer, Nicholas Ridley, and Robert Ferrar (1555), Bishops, Teachers of the Faith and Martyrs
- 24 Oscar Romero (1980), Bishop and Martyr
- 25 The Annunciation of our Lord to the Blessed Virgin Mary
- 29 Woolos (6th century), King
- 30 John Keble, Priest and Teacher (1886)
- 31 John Donne, Priest and Poet (1631)

Eastertide: Thanksgiving for Holy Baptism

=== April ===
- 3 Richard, Bishop (1253)
- 7 Brynach (5th century), Abbot
- 8 Griffith Jones (1761), Priest and Teacher of the Faith
- 9 Saints, Martyrs and Missionaries of South America
- 9 Dietrich Bonhoeffer (1945), Pastor, Teacher of the Faith and Martyr
- 11 George Augustus Selwyn (1878), Bishop and Missionary
- 15 Padarn (6th century), Bishop
- 20 Beuno (c 640), Abbot
- 21 Anselm (1109), Bishop and Doctor
- 23 George (304?), Martyr, Patron Saint of England
- 25 Mark, Evangelist
- 29 Catherine of Siena (1380), Writer

Ember Days: Wednesday, Friday and Saturday following Pentecost

Thursday after Trinity Sunday: Thanksgiving for the Holy Communion

=== May ===
- 1 Philip and James, Apostles
- 2 Athanasius (373), Bishop and Doctor
- 3 Henry Vaughan (1695), Poet
- 4 Monica (378)
- 5 Asaph (6th century), Bishop
- 8 Julian of Norwich (c 1417)
- 9 Gregory of Nazianzus (390), Bishop
- 14 Matthias, Apostle
- 15 Edmund Prys (1624), Priest, Poet and Translator
- 15 John Davies (1644), Priest and Translator
- 19 Dunstan (988), Bishop
- 20 Chad (672), Bishop
- 24 Charles Wesley (1788) and John Wesley (1791), Priests and Missionaries
- 25 Julian of Norwich (c 1417)
- 25 Bede (735), Doctor
- 26 Augustine of Canterbury (605), Bishop
- 27 The Venerable Bede, Doctor (735)
- 28 Melangell (6th century), Abbess
- 31 The Visit of the Virgin Mary to Elizabeth

Ember Days: Wednesday, Friday & Saturday following Pentecost

=== June ===
- 1 Justin (c 165), Apologist and Martyr
- 1 Euddogwy, Bishop (6th century)
- 2 Blandina and her Companions (177), Martyrs
- 3 James Hannington (1885), Bishop, Missionary and Martyr
- 3 Martyrs of Uganda (1886)
- 3 Janani Luwum, (1977), Bishop and Martyr
- 5 Boniface (754), Bishop, Missionary and Martyr
- 9 Columba (597), Abbot
- 10 Ephrem the Syrian (373), Deacon, Hymnwriter, and Teacher of the Faith
- 11 Barnabas, Apostle
- 14 Basil the Great (397), Bishop and Doctor
- 16 Richard (1253), Bishop
- 20 Alban (250), Martyr
- 20 Julius and Aaron (304–5), Martyrs
- 24 The Nativity of John the Baptist
- 28 Irenaeus (c 200), Bishop and Doctor
- 29 Peter, Apostle
- 29 Peter and Paul, Apostles
- 30 The Martyrdom of Paul, Apostle

=== July ===
- 1 Euddogwy (6th century), Bishop
- 2 The Visitation of the Blessed Virgin Mary
- 3 Thomas, Apostle
- 4 Peblig (4th century), Abbot
- 6 Thomas More (1535), Martyr
- 11 Benedict (c 540), Abbot
- 14 John Keble (1886), Priest and Teacher of the Faith
- 18 Elizabeth of Russia (1918), Religious and Martyr
- 19 Gregory of Nyssa (c 394), Bishop, Teachers of the Faith
- 19 Macrina (c 379), Virgin, Teacher of the Faith
- 21 Howell Harris (1773), Preacher
- 22 Mary Magdalene
- 23 Bridget of Sweden (1373), Abbess
- 25 James, Apostle
- 26 Anne, Mother of the Virgin Mary
- 26 Anne and Joachim Parents of the Blessed Virgin Mary
- 27 Martha and Mary of Bethany
- 27 Martha, Mary and Lazarus of Bethany
- 28 Samson (5th century), Bishop of Dôl
- 29 William Wilberforce (1833), Josephine Butler (1906) and all Social Reformers
- 30 Silas, Missionary
- 31 Joseph of Arimathea
- 31 Ignatius of Loyola (1556), founder of the Society of Jesus

=== August ===
- 3 Germanus of Auxerre (5th century), Bishop
- 5 Oswald (642), King and Martyr
- 6 The Transfiguration of our Lord
- 7 Mary Sumner (1921)
- 8 Dominic of Toulouse (1221), Abbot and Preacher
- 9 Augustine Baker (1641), Priest and Religious
- 9 Mary Sumner (1921), Founder of the Mothers' Union
- 9 Edith Stein (1942), Teacher of the Faith, Religious and Martyr
- 10 Lawrence (258), Deacon and Martyr
- 11 Clare of Assisi (1253), Abbess, Founder of the Minoresses (Poor Clares) and Mendicant
- 12 Ann Griffiths (1805), Poet
- 13 Jeremy Taylor (1667), Bishop
- 14 Maximilian Kolbe (1941), Priest and Martyr
- 15 Mary, Mother of our Lord
- 20 Bernard (1153), Abbot
- 23 Tydfil (430), Martyr
- 24 Bartholomew, Apostle
- 25 Timothy and Titus
- 27 Monica (378), Mother of Augustine of Hippo
- 28 Augustine of Hippo (430), Bishop and Doctor
- 29 The Beheading of John the Baptist
- 31 Aidan (651), Bishop

=== September ===
- 2 Lucian Tapiedi (1942), Missionary and Martyr
- 2 Martyrs of Papua New Guinea (1901 & 1942)
- 3 Gregory the Great (604), Bishop and Doctor
- 4 Cuthbert (687), Bishop
- 8 The Nativity of the Blessed Virgin Mary
- 10 William Salesbury (1584), Translator
- 10 William Morgan (1604), Bishop and Translator
- 11 Deiniol (6th century), Bishop
- 13 Cyprian (258), Bishop, Doctor and Martyr
- 14 Holy Cross
- 16 Ninian (c 430), Bishop
- 20 Saints, Martyrs and Missionaries of Australasia & the Pacific
- 21 Matthew, Apostle and Evangelist
- 25 Sergei of Radonezh (1392), Abbot
- 25 Cadoc (6th century), Abbot
- 26 Lancelot Andrewes (1626), Bishop
- 27 Vincent de Paul (1660), Priest
- 29 Michael and All Angels
- 30 Jerome (420), Doctor

Ember Days: Wednesday, Friday & Saturday following 14 September

=== October ===
- 4 Francis of Assisi (1226), Friar
- 6 William Tyndale (1536), Translator and Martyr
- 9 Cynog (5th century), Abbot
- 13 Edward the Confessor (1066), King
- 14 Esther John (1960), Missionary and Martyr
- 15 Teresa of Avila (1582), Teacher of the Faith
- 16 Daniel Rowland (1790), Priest and Preacher
- 17 Ignatius (c 117), Bishop and Martyr
- 18 Luke, Evangelist
- 19 Henry Martyn (1812), Pastor, Translator and Missionary
- 23 James of Jerusalem, Bishop
- 25 Lewis Bayley (1631), Bishop and Writer
- 26 Alfred (899), King
- 28 Simon and Jude, Apostles
- 30 Richard Hooker (1600), Priest and Teacher of the Faith
- 31 Vigil of All Saints
- 31 Catholic and Protestant Saints and Martyrs of the Reformation Era

=== November ===
- 1 All Saints
- 2 The Commemoration of All Souls
- 3 The Martyrs and Confessors of our Time
- 3 Winifred (7th century), Abbess
- 4 The Saints and Martyrs of the Anglican Communion
- 5 Cybi (6th century), Abbot
- 6 Illtud (5th century), Abbot
- 7 Richard Davies (1581), Bishop and Translator
- 8 The Saints of Wales
- 10 Leo (461), Bishop and Doctor
- 11 Martin of Tours (c 397), Bishop
- 12 Tysilio (6th century), Abbot
- 13 Charles Simeon (1836), Priest and Teacher of the Faith
- 14 Dyfrig (5th – 6th century), Bishop
- 15 The Saints, Martyrs and Missionaries of North America
- 16 Margaret of Scotland (c. 1045 – 1093), Queen
- 17 Hugh (1200), Bishop
- 18 Hilda (680), Abbess
- 19 Elizabeth of Hungary (1231), Princess
- 21 Paulinus (5th century), Abbot
- 22 Cecilia (230), Martyr
- 23 Clement (c 100), Bishop
- 25 John Donne (1631), Priest and Poet
- 29 Vigil and Day of Intercession for the Mission of the Church
- 30 Andrew, Apostle, Patron Saint of Scotland

=== December ===
- 1 Nicholas Ferrar (1637), Deacon
- 2 The Saints, Martyrs and Missionaries of Asia
- 3 Francis Xavier (1552), Missionary
- 6 Nicholas (c 342), Bishop
- 7 Ambrose (397), Bishop and Doctor
- 8 Cynidr (6th century), Bishop
- 13 Lucy (304), Martyr
- 14 John of the Cross (1591), Priest, Poet and Teacher of the Faith
- 17 O Wisdom!
- 18 O Adonai!
- 19 O Root of Jesse!
- 20 O Key of David!
- 21 O Dayspring!
- 21 Thomas, Apostle
- 22 O King of the nations!
- 23 O Emmanuel!
- 24 Vigil
- 25 Nativity of the Lord: Christmas Day
- 26 Stephen, Deacon and First Martyr
- 27 John, Apostle and Evangelist
- 28 The Innocents
- 29 Thomas of Canterbury (1170), Bishop and Martyr
- 30 Tathan (6th century), Abbot
- 31 John Wycliffe (1384), Priest and Translator

Ember Days: Wednesday, Friday & Saturday following 13 December

== See also ==
- Calendar of saints
- Calendar of saints (Church of England)
- General Roman Calendar
