= Stephen A. Metcalf =

British Protestant missionary to Japan

Stephen Arnold Metcalf (23 October 1927 – 7 June 2014) was a British Protestant missionary to Japan, the son of George Edgar Metcalf and Elizabeth Mary (Donnelly) Metcalf, China Inland Mission missionaries to the Eastern Lisu/Lipo minority of Yunnan Province. He was born in Kunming, China.

== China ==
Metcalf was educated at Chefoo School, the China Inland Mission school in Yantai, Shandong Province. On 5 November 1942 the school was closed by the Japanese occupying army and the staff and pupils interned in an American Presbyterian mission compound on Temple Hill, Yantai. Metcalf was amongst those interned and had no contact with his parents and his elder sister, Ruth (b. 24 June 1924, d. 18 January 2010), until his release in 1945. While in this POW camp, Metcalf made a Christian commitment.

In September 1943 the Temple Hill civilian internment camp was closed and the internees moved to another camp at Weihsien (Weifang), Shandong Province. At Weihsien, Metcalf was befriended by Eric Liddell, the Olympic medallist, and greatly influenced by Liddell's attitude to the Japanese to pray for his captors. Just prior to his death Liddell gave Metcalf, a keen runner, his running shoes. Metcalf was a coffin bearer at Liddell's funeral in the camp in February 1945 and at the ceremony committed himself to serve as a missionary in Japan. The Weihsien civilian internment camp was liberated on 17 August 1945.

== Australia ==
In 1945 Metcalf relocated to Australia in November 1945 and trained at Melbourne Bible College. He was accepted by OMF International as a missionary to Japan in 1952. His sister, Ruth, was also accepted as a missionary by OMF International and served in Thailand from 1952 to 1965. In 1948, he graduated from Melbourne Bible College cum laude.

== Japan ==
Metcalf arrived in Japan in November 1952 and entered the OMF International language school at Karuizawa, Honshu. In 1953 he was designated to work in Aomori Prefecture, planting new churches. On 3 July 1957 he married Evelyn Robinson, an OMF International missionary from Northern Ireland. They have five children, four boys and one girl. They were responsible for the successful establishing and consolidation of new churches in several towns of Aomori Prefecture, in Otaru (Hokkaido), Hachinohe (Honshu), Sendai (Honshu) and Urayasu city, Tokyo.

== UK ==
The Metcalfs retired from missionary service in Japan in August 1990, with over seventy years of service between them. In retirement Metcalf served in ministry with the Japan Christian Fellowship, London, for a further fifteen years. In 2005 he delivered the Eric Liddell Memorial Speech at the sixtieth anniversary of liberation of the Weishien civilian internment camp. He has been the subject of two biographies – Take the Torch Shining in the Dark, published 2005 in Japanese, and In Japan the Crickets Cry, published 2010 – and has featured in TV programmes and documentaries about Eric Liddell.
