= China Candid =

Book by Sang Ye

China Candid: The People on the People's Republic
- Editor: Geremie Barmé, Miriam Lang
- Author: Ye Sang, Geremie Barmé, Miriam Lang
- Publisher: University of California Press
- Publication date: January 4, 2006
- ISBN: 9780520245143

China Candid: The People on the People's Republic (University of California Press, 2006) is a book written by Chinese journalist Sang Ye.

It is the second book of interviews Sang has been involved in, following co-authorship with Zhang Xinxin on Chinese Profiles (Beijing 1986), revised as Chinese Lives (1988).

The author interviewed thirty-six citizens of the People's Republic of China; each chapter of the book is a transcript of each interview turned into a single narrative flow, as if the interviewed person is talking alone during the whole interview, without interruptions from the journalist.

Some people the author has interviewed are:

- a new tycoon
- a worker coming to Beijing from the countryside
- a young athlete
- the founder of a private orphanage
- a prostitute
- a computer hacker

It was translated into Italian in 2007.
