= Manche Masemola =

South African Christian martyr

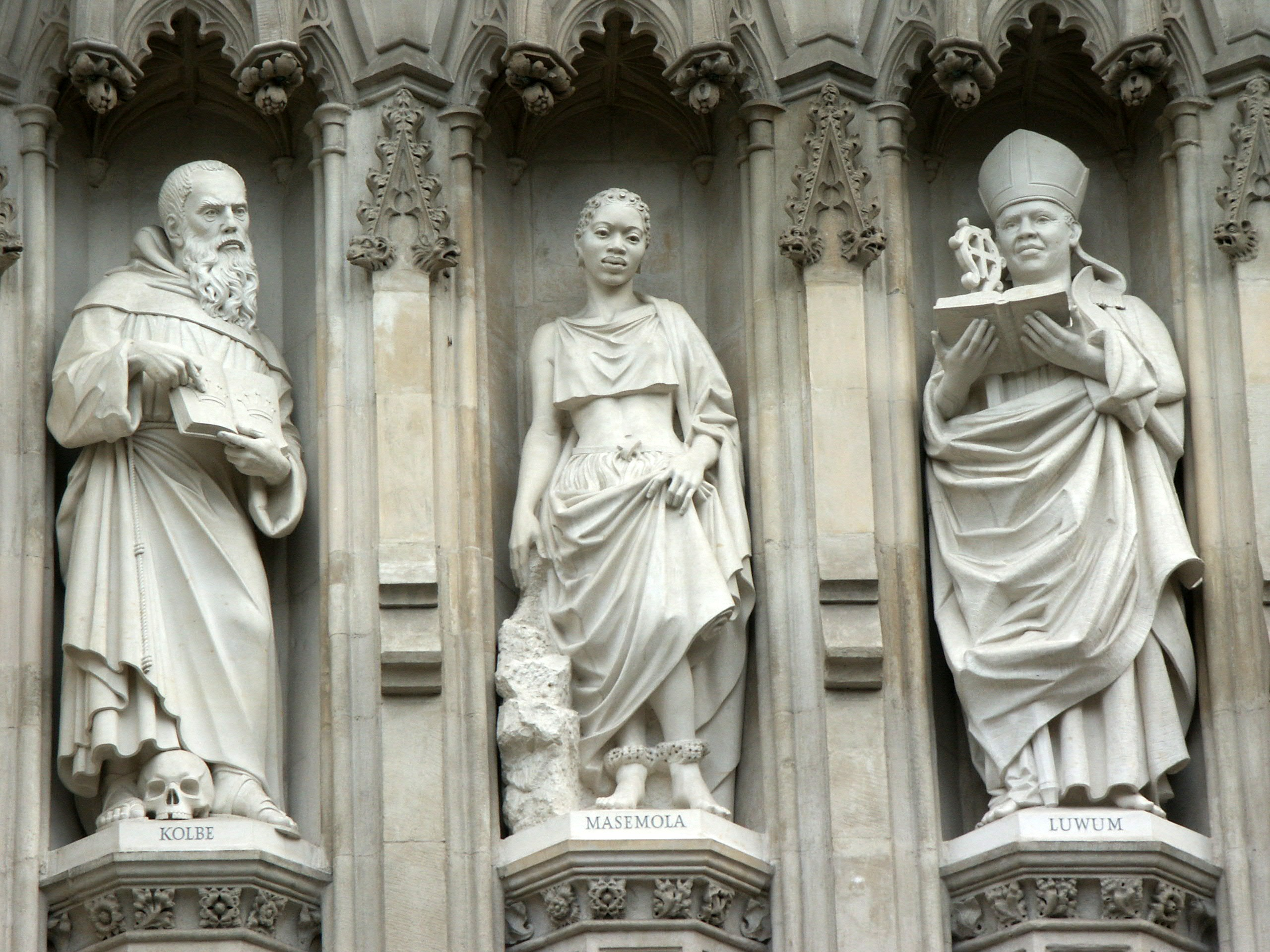
- A statue of Masemola (centre), part of the Modern Martyrs of Westminster Abbey

Martyr
- Born: 1913
- Died: 1928 (aged 14–15)
- Venerated in: Anglican Communion
- Feast: 4 February

Manche Masemola (1913–1928) was a South African Christian martyr.

== Manche's early life ==
Manche was born in Marishane, a small village near Jane Furse, in South Africa. She lived with her parents, two older brothers, a sister, and a cousin. German and then English missionaries had worked in the Transvaal Colony for several decades and by the early twentieth century there was a small Christian community among the Pedi people which was widely viewed with distrust by the remainder of the tribe who still practiced the traditional religion.

== Martyrdom ==
By 1919, an Anglican Community of the Resurrection mission was established by Fr. Augustine Moeka in Marishane. Masemola attended classes in preparation for baptism with her cousin Lucia, against the wishes of her parents. Her parents took her to a sangoma (African traditional healer), claiming that she had been bewitched. She was prescribed a traditional remedy, which her parents made her consume by beating her. Relations worsened, and the mother hid the girl's clothes so she could not attend Christian instructional classes. On February 4, 1928, her parents led the teenager to a lonely place, where they killed her, burying her by a granite rock on a remote hillside.

Manche had said that she would be baptized in her own blood. She died without having been baptized. Manche's mother converted to Christianity and was baptised forty years later in 1969.

Manche was declared a martyr by the Church of the Province of Southern Africa in less than ten years.

== Commemoration ==
The Anglican Church of Southern Africa commemorates Manche in its calendar of saints on the 4th day of February each year, as do some other churches in the Anglican Communion. She is one of the ten 20th-century martyrs from across the world who are depicted in statues above the Great West Door of Westminster Abbey, London.

Manche Masemola is honored with a Lesser Feast on the liturgical calendar of the Episcopal Church in the United States of America on February 4.

== Notes and references ==
=== Sources ===
- Chandler, Andrew (2007). Br Tristam SSF and Simon Kershaw (ed.). Exciting Holiness. Norwich: Canterbury Press. ISBN 978-1-85311-806-7.
- Davie, Lucille (4 February 2008). "Alex honours Africa's only saint (sic)". Official website of the City of Johannesburg. Archived from the original on 2014-08-08.
- Goedhals, Mandy (1998). "Imperialism, mission and conversion: Manche Masemola of Sekhukhuneland". In Andrew Chandler (ed.). Terrible Alternative: Christian Martyrdom in the 20th Century. Continuum International Publishing Group, Limited. ISBN 978-0-8264-4844-6.
- Presler, Titus (2001). Horizons of Mission. Cowley Publications. p. 85. ISBN 978-1-4616-6060-6.
- Quinn, Frederick (2002). African Saints: Saints, Martyrs, and Holy People from the Continent of Africa. Crossroad. ISBN 978-0-8245-1971-1.
- Quinn, Frederick. "Manche Masemola, South Africa, Anglican". Dictionary of African Christian Biography. Archived from the original on 2011-05-17.
- St. James, Rebecca (2008). Sister Freaks: Stories of Women Who Gave Up Everything for God. FaithWords. ISBN 978-0-446-55016-1.
- The story of Manche Masemola and her fight for faith (video). BBC.
