= Esther John =

Pakistani Christian nurse and martyr

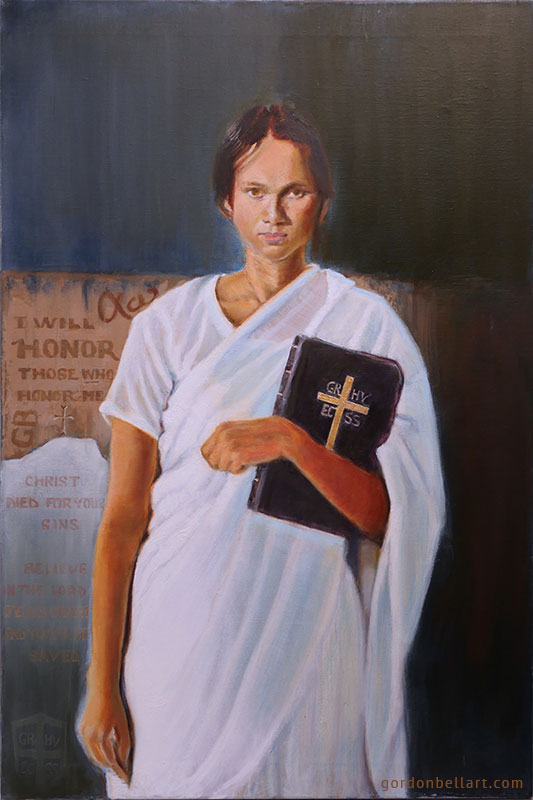
Portrait of Esther John by Gordon Bell

Esther John (Urdu: ایستھر جون), born Qamar Zia (Urdu: قمر ضيا), on 14 October 1929; died 2 February 1960) was a Pakistani Christian nurse who was murdered in 1960 for her efforts in Christian evangelism. She was subsequently recognized as a Christian martyr. In 1998, she was honoured with a statue above the great west door of Westminster Abbey, among nine other Christian martyrs of the twentieth century.

== Early life ==
Qamar Zia was born into a Muslim family on 14 October 1929, in British India. She attended a Christian school from the age of seventeen, and was so inspired by the Book of Isaiah that she decided to convert to Presbyterian Christianity.

== Career ==
After the partition of colonial India, Zia's family migrated from Madras in independent India to the newly-born Pakistan in 1947. She continued to study the Bible in secret, and seven years later ran away from home, fearing that her family would force her into a marriage. She took a job in an orphanage in Laugesen, Karachi, and changed her name to Esther John. In June 1955, she moved to Sahiwal, where she lived and worked in a mission hospital. From 1956 to 1959, she trained to be a teacher at the United Bible Training Centre in Gujranwala, then spent the remainder of her life evangelizing in the villages around Chichawatni.

== Death ==
Due to her efforts in Christian evangelism, Esther John was murdered in her bed on 2 February 1960, at her home in Chichawatni. She was buried at the Christian cemetery at Sahiwal. As such, she is recognized as a Christian martyr.

In 1998, ten statues were unveiled above the great west door of Westminster Abbey in London, depicting ten 20th century Christian martyrs. Esther John was among them, alongside such figures as Óscar Romero and Martin Luther King Jr.
