= Calendar of saints (Scottish Episcopal Church) =

Scottish Episcopal Church calendar

In the Calendar of the Scottish Episcopal Church, each holy and saint's day listed has been assigned a number which indicates its category. It is intended that feasts in categories 1 - 4 should be kept by the whole church. Days in categories 5 and 6 may be kept according to diocesan or local discretion. Commemorations not included in this calendar may be observed with the approval of the bishop.

== Categories ==
=== Category 1 ===
- Maundy Thursday, Good Friday, Holy Saturday
- Easter Day (and the weekdays following)
- Pentecost
- Ash Wednesday
- Holy Week
- Ascension Day
- Christmas Day
- Epiphany
- Sundays of Advent, Lent and Easter

=== Category 2 ===
- Feasts of The Lord (Naming, Presentation, Annunciation, Transfiguration)
- Trinity Sunday
- All Saints' Day
- Dedication and Patronal Festivals
- Eves of Christmas and Pentecost
- First Sunday after Christmas
- First Sunday after Epiphany (Baptism of the Lord)

=== Category 3 ===
- Sundays after Christmas (except Christmas 1)
- Sundays after Epiphany (except Epiphany 1)
- Sundays after Pentecost (except Pentecost 1)
- Weekdays in Lent

=== Category 4 ===
- Feasts of the Apostles and Evangelists
- Saint Mary the Virgin, The Visit to Elizabeth
- Saint Joseph, Saint John the Baptist (Birth, Beheading)
- Saint Mary Magdalene, Saint Michael and All Angels
- Saint James of Jerusalem
- Saint Stephen, The Holy Innocents
- Saint Kentigern, Saint Patrick, Saint Columba, Saint Ninian, Saint Margaret of Scotland

=== Category 5 ===
- All Souls' Day, Holy Cross Day;
- Conception of Mary, Mother of the Lord, Birth of Mary, Mother of the Lord
- Thanksgiving for the Institution of the Holy Communion (Corpus Christi);
- Thanksgiving for Harvest

=== Category 6 ===
- All other commemorations

== Calendar days ==
=== January ===
- 2 Seraphim of Sarov, 1833
- 10 William Laud, Bishop, 1645
- 11 David, King of Scots, 1153
- 14 Hilary of Poitiers, Bishop and Teacher of the Faith, c. 367
- 17 Anthony of Egypt, Abbot, 356
- 21 Agnes, Martyr, c. 304
- 24 Francis de Sales, Bishop, 1622
- 27 John Chrysostom, Bishop and Teacher of the Faith, 407
- 28 Thomas Aquinas, Teacher of the Faith, 1274
- 30 Charles I, King, 1649
- 31 Charles Mackenzie of Central Africa, Bishop, Missionary, Martyr, 1862

=== February ===
- 1 Brigid of Kildare, Abbess, c. 525
- 3 Saints and Martyrs of Europe
- 6 Paul Miki, Priest, and the Martyrs of Japan, 1597
- 10 Scholastica, Religious, 543
- 14 Cyril, Monk, 869, and Methodius, Bishop, 885, "Apostles of the Slavs"
- 15 Thomas Bray, Priest and Missionary, 1730
- 17 Finan of Lindisfarne, Bishop, 661
- 18 Colman of Lindisfarne, Bishop, 676
- 19 Martin Luther, 1545
- 23 Polycarp of Smyrna, Bishop and Martyr, 156

=== March ===
- 1 David, Bishop, Patron of Wales, c. 544
- 2 Chad of Lichfield, Bishop, 672
- 3 John and Charles Wesley, Priests, 1791, 1788
- 4 Adrian of May Island, Abbot, and Companions, Martyrs, 875
- 6 Baldred, Bishop, 608
- 7 Perpetua and her Companions, Martyrs, 203
- 8 Duthac, Bishop, 1068
- 10 Kessog, Bishop, c. 700
- 16 Boniface of Ross, Bishop, 8th century
- 18 Cyril of Jerusalem, Bishop and Teacher of the Faith, 386
- 20 Cuthbert, Bishop, 687
- 21 Thomas Cranmer, Bishop, 1556
- 22 Thomas Ken, Bishop, 1711
- 24 Paul Couturier, Priest, 1953
- 28 Patrick Forbes, Bishop, 1635, and the Aberdeen doctors, Teachers of the Faith
- 29 John Keble, Priest, 1866

=== April ===
- 1 Gilbert of Caithness, Bishop, 1245
- 9 Dietrich Bonhoeffer, Theologian and Martyr, 1945
- 10 William Law, Priest, 1761
- 11 George Augustus Selwyn, Bishop and Missionary, 1878
- 12 William Forbes, Bishop, 1634
- 16 Magnus of Orkney, Martyr, c. 1116
- 17 Saint Donnan, Abbot, and Companions, Martyrs, c. 617
- 20 Máel Ruba of Applecross, Abbot, 722
- 21 Anselm of Canterbury, Bishop and Teacher of the Faith, 1109
- 23 George, Patron of England, Martyr, c. 303
- 26 Albert Ernest Laurie, Priest, 1937
- 29 Catherine of Siena, Mystic and Teacher of the Faith, 1380

=== May ===
- 2 Athanasius of Alexandria, Bishop and Teacher of the Faith, 373
- 8 Julian of Norwich, c. 1413
- 12 Thomas Rattray, Bishop, 1743
- 21 Helena, c. 330
- 23 William of Perth (or Rochester), 1201
- 25 Bede, the Venerable, of Jarrow, Teacher of the Faith, 735
- 26 Augustine of Canterbury, Bishop, c. 604

=== June ===
- 1 Justin of Rome, Martyr, c. 165
- 3 Charles Lwanga and his companions, 1886, Janani Luwum, Bishop, 1977, Martyrs of Uganda
- 4 John XXIII, Bishop of Rome, Reformer, 1963
- 5 Boniface of Mainz, Bishop, Missionary and Martyr, 754
- 8 Ephrem the Syrian, Deacon and Teacher of the Faith, 373
- 12 John Skinner, Priest, 1807, and John Skinner, Bishop, 1816
- 14 Basil of Caesarea, 379; Gregory of Nazianzus, 390; Gregory of Nyssa, 394, Bishops and Teachers of the Faith
- 18 Bernard Mizeki, Martyr, 1896
- 20 Fillan, Abbot, c. 750
- 22 Alban, Martyr, c. 209
- 25 Moluag of Lismore, Bishop, c. 592
- 26 Robert Leighton, Bishop, 1684
- 27 Alexander Jolly, Bishop, 1838
- 28 Irenaeus of Lyons, Bishop and Teacher of the Faith, 202

=== July ===
- 1 Serf, Bishop, c. 500
- 6 Palladius, Bishop, c. 450
- 7 Boisil, Prior of Melrose, c. 642
- 11 Benedict of Nursia, Abbot, c. 550
- 12 Drostan of Deer, Abbot, c. 600
- 17 Jane Haining, Missionary and Martyr, 1944
- 21 William Wilberforce, 1833
- 26 Anne and Joachim, Parents of Mary, Mother of the Lord
- 27 John Comper, Priest, 1903
- 29 Martha and Mary of Bethany
- 30 Silas, Companion of Saint Paul
- 31 Ignatius Loyola, Priest and Religious, 1556

=== August ===
- 5 Oswald of Northumbria, Martyr, 642
- 7 John Mason Neale, Priest, 1866
- 8 Dominic, Priest and Friar, 1221
- 10 Lawrence, Deacon and Martyr, 258
- 11 Clare of Assisi, Religious, 1253
- 12 Blane, Missionary, c. 590
- 13 Jeremy Taylor, Bishop, 1667
- 14 Maximilian Kolbe, Priest and Martyr, 1940
- 20 Bernard of Clairvaux, Abbot and Teacher of the Faith, 1153
- 25 Ebba of Coldingham, Abbess, 683
- 27 Monica, Mother of Augustine of Hippo, 387
- 28 Augustine of Hippo, Bishop and Teacher of the Faith, 430
- 31 Aidan of Lindisfarne, Bishop, 651

=== September ===
- 2 The Martyrs of New Guinea, 1942
- 3 Gregory the Great, Bishop and Teacher of the Faith, 604
- 13 Cyprian of Carthage, Bishop and Martyr, 258
- 17 Hildegard of Bingen, Abbess, 1179
- 20 John Coleridge Patteson, Bishop and Martyr, 1871
- 23 Adamnan of Iona, Abbot, 704
- 25 Finnbar of Caithness, Bishop, c. 610
- 27 Vincent de Paul, Priest, 1660
- 30 Jerome, Priest and Teacher of the Faith, 420

=== October ===
- 1 Gregory the Enlightener, Bishop, “Apostle of Armenia”, c. 332
- 4 Francis of Assisi, Deacon and Friar, 1226
- 8 Alexander Penrose Forbes, Bishop, 1875
- 11 Kenneth, Abbot, 600
- 12 Elizabeth Fry, 18456
- 15 Teresa of Avila, Teacher of the Faith, 1582
- 17 Ignatius of Antioch, Bishop and Martyr, c. 115
- 19 Henry Martyn, Priest and Missionary, 1812
- 29 James Hannington, Bishop, and Companions, Martyrs, 1885

=== November ===
- 3 Richard Hooker, Priest and Teacher of the Faith, 1600
- 7 Willibrord, Bishop and Missionary, 739
- 9 George Hay Forbes, Priest, 1875
- 10 Leo the Great, Bishop and Teacher of the Faith, 461
- 11 Martin of Tours, Bishop, c. 397
- 12 Machar, Bishop, c. 600
- 17 Hugh of Lincoln, Bishop, 1200
- 18 Fergus, Bishop, c. 750
- 19 Hilda of Whitby, 680
- 21 Columban, Bishop, 615
- 22 Cecilia, Martyr, c. 230
- 23 Clement of Rome, Bishop and Martyr, c. 100
- 24 Lucy Menzies, 1954

=== December ===
- 1 Charles de Foucauld, Priest and Hermit, 1916
- 2 Nicholas Ferrar, Deacon, 1637
- 3 Francis Xavier, Priest and Missionary, 1552
- 4 Clement of Alexandria, Teacher of the Faith, c. 210
- 6 Nicholas of Myra, Bishop, 4th century
- 7 Ambrose of Milan, Bishop and Teacher of the Faith, 397
- 14 John of the Cross, Priest, Teacher of the Faith, 1591
- 29 Thomas of Canterbury, Bishop and Martyr, 1170
- 30 Josephine Butler, 1905
- 31 John Wycliffe, Priest, 1384

== Sources ==
- SEC digital calendar
