= Calendar of saints (Anglican Church of Korea) =

List of Calendar of saints for Anglican Church of Korea

The Anglican Church of Korea has its own calendar of saints.

== January ==
- 2 Basil and Gregory. 379 and 389.
- 6 Epiphany.
- 13 George Fox. 1691.
- 20 Richard Rolle. 1349.
- 21 Agnes. 304.
- 24 Francis de Sales. 1622.
- 26 Timothy and Titus.
- 28 Thomas Aquinas. 1274.

== February ==
- 3 Ansgar. 865.
- 6 Martyrs of Japan. 1597.
- 14 Cyril and Methodius. 869 and 885.
- 15 Thomas Bray. 1730.
- 27 George Herbert. 1633.

== March ==
- 7 Martyrs of Carthage. 203.
- 17 Patrick. Apostle of Ireland. 460.
- 19 Joseph. Husband of Mary.
- 21 Thomas Cranmer. Archbishop of Canterbury. 1556.
- 24 Walter Hilton. 1396.
- 25 Annunciation.
- 31 John Donne. 1631.

== April ==
- 10 William Law. 1761.
- 21 Anselm. Archbishop of Canterbury. 1109.
- 23 George. Patron saint of England. 304.
- 25 Mark the Evangelist.
- 26 Crown Prince Sohyeon. 1645.
- 29 Catherine of Siena. 1380.

== May ==
- 1 James and Philip.
- 8 Julian. 1417.
- 14 Matthias.
- 21 Helena. 330.
- 24 John and Charles Wesley. 1791 and 1788.
- 26 Augustine. first Archbishop of Canterbury. 605.
- 31 Visitation.

== June ==
- 8 Thomas Ken. 1711.
- 11 Barnabas.
- 14 Richard Baxter. 1691.
- 16 Joseph Butler. 1752.
- 24 Nativity of St. John the Baptist.
- 29 Peter and Paul. 64 and 67.

== July ==
- 1 Henry Venn. 1797.
- 3 Thomas.
- 11 Benedict. 547.
- 15 Bonaventure. 1274.
- 19 Gregory. 394.
- 20 las Casas. 1566.
- 22 Mary Magdalene.
- 23 Bridget. 1373.
- 25 James. 44.
- 26 Anne and Joachim.
- 30 William Wilberforce. 1833.
- 31 Ignatius. 1556.

== August ==
- 6 Transfiguration of Jesus.
- 8 Saint Dominic. 1221.
- 11 Clare of Assisi. 1253.
- 13 Florence Nightingale.
- 15 Mary.
- 20 William and Catherine Booth.
- 24 Bartholomew.
- 28 Augustine. 430.
- 30 John Bunyan. 1688.

== September ==
- 3 Gregory I. 604.
- 13 John Chrysostom. 407.
- 20 Martyrs of Korea. 1801.
- 21 Matthew the Evangelist.
- 25 Lancelot Andrewes. 1626.
- 27 Vincent de Paul. 1660.
- 29 Michael.
- 30 Jerome. 420.

== October ==
- 4 Francis of Assisi. 1226.
- 6 William Tyndale. 1536.
- 10 Thomas Traherne. 1674.
- 15 Teresa of Ávila. 1582.
- 16 Nicholas Ridley. 1555.
- 18 Luke the Evangelist.
- 19 Henry Martyn. 1812.
- 28 Simon and Jude.
- 31 Martin Luther. 1546.

== November ==
- 1 All Saints.
- 3 Richard Hooker. 1600.
- 3 Martin of Porres. 1639.
- 10 Leo I. 461.
- 14 Samuel Seabury. 1796.
- 16 Edmund Rich, Archbishop of Canterbury. 1240.
- 23 Clement I. 100.
- 25 Isaac Watts. 1748.
- 30 Saint Andrew. 38.

== December ==
- 3 Francis Xavier. 1552.
- 4 Nicholas Ferrar. 1637.
- 8 The Conception of the Blessed Virgin Mary.
- 13 Samuel Johnson. 1784.
- 14 John of the Cross. 1591.
- 25 Christmas.
- 26 Saint Stephen.
- 27 John the Apostle. 100.
- 29 Thomas Becket. 1170.
- 31 John Wyclif. 1384.

== See also ==
- Calendar of saints (Hong Kong Sheng Kung Hui)
