= Calendar of saints (Hong Kong Sheng Kung Hui) =

Hong Kong Anglican Church calendar

The Hong Kong Sheng Kung Hui, also known as the Hong Kong Anglican Church (Episcopal), an Anglican Church in Hong Kong and Macau, has its own calendar of saints.

== Moveable Dates ==
- The Baptism of Christ, the Sunday following the Epiphany (when the Epiphany is kept on 6 January)
- ASH WEDNESDAY, the Wednesday 46 days before Easter Day
- MAUNDY THURSDAY, the Thursday in the week before Easter Day
- GOOD FRIDAY, the Friday in the week before Easter Day
- EASTER DAY, the first Sunday after the Paschal full moon
- ASCENSION DAY, the Thursday forty days after Easter Day
- DAY OF PENTECOST, the Sunday fifty days after Easter Day
- TRINITY SUNDAY, the Sunday after Pentecost
- The Day of Thanksgiving for the Institution of Holy Communion (Corpus Christi), the Thursday after Trinity Sunday
- Dedication Festival
- Christ the King, the Sunday next before Advent

== January ==
- 1 The Naming and Circumcision of Jesus
- 2 Basil the Great and Gregory of Nazianzus, Bishops, Teachers of the Faith, 379 and 389
- 6 THE EPIPHANY – may be celebrated on the Sunday between 2 and 8 January
- 18–25 WEEK OF PRAYER FOR CHRISTIAN UNITY
- 25 The Conversion of Paul
- 26 Timothy and Titus, Companions of Paul
- 28 Thomas Aquinas, Priest, Philosopher, Teacher of the Faith, 1274

== February ==
- 2 THE PRESENTATION OF CHRIST IN THE TEMPLE (Candlemas) – may be celebrated on the Sunday between 28 January and 3 February
- 23 Polycarp, Bishop of Smyrna, Martyr, c.155
- 27 Matthias the Apostle

== March ==
- 17 Patrick, Bishop, Missionary, Patron of Ireland, c.460
- 19 Joseph of Nazareth
- 25 THE ANNUNCIATION OF OUR LORD TO THE BLESSED VIRGIN MARY

== April ==
- 21 Anselm, Abbot of Le Bec, Archbishop of Canterbury, Teacher of the Faith, 1109
- 23 George, Martyr, Patron of England, c.304
- 25 Mark the Evangelist

== May ==
- 1 Philip and James, Apostles
- 2 Athanasius, Bishop of Alexandria, Teacher of the Faith, 373
- 9 Saint Christopher, Martyr, c.251
- 26 Augustine, first Archbishop of Canterbury, 605
- 31 The Visit of the Blessed Virgin Mary to Elizabeth

== June ==
- 1 Justin, Martyr at Rome, c.165
- 11 Barnabas the Apostle
- 24 The Birth of John the Baptist
- 28 Irenæus, Bishop of Lyon, Teacher of the Faith, c.200
- 29 Peter and Paul, Apostles

== July ==
- 3 Thomas the Apostle
- 11 Benedict of Nursia, Abbot of Monte Cassino, Father of Western Monasticism, c.550
- 22 Mary Magdalene
- 25 James the Apostle
- 26 Anne and Joachim, Parents of the Blessed Virgin Mary
- 29 Mary, Martha and Lazarus, Companions of Our Lord
- 31 Ignatius of Loyola, Founder of the Society of Jesus, 1556

== August ==
- 6 The Transfiguration of Our Lord
- 8 Dominic, Priest, Founder of the Order of Preachers, 1221
- 10 Laurence, Deacon at Rome, Martyr, 258
- 11 Clare of Assisi, Founder of the Minoresses (Poor Clares), 1253
- 24 Bartholomew the Apostle
- 28 Augustine, Bishop of Hippo, Teacher of the Faith, 430
- 29 The Beheading of John the Baptist

== September ==
- 3 Gregory the Great, Bishop of Rome, Teacher of the Faith, 604
- 8 Blessed Virgin Mary
- 13 John Chrysostom, Bishop of Constantinople, Teacher of the Faith, 407
- 14 Holy Cross Day
- 21 Matthew, Apostle and Evangelist
- 29 Michael and All Angels
- 30 Jerome, Translator of the Scriptures, Teacher of the Faith, 420

== October ==
- 4 Francis of Assisi, Friar, Deacon, Founder of the Friars Minor, 1226
- 18 Luke the Evangelist
- 28 Simon and Jude, Apostles

== November ==
- 1 ALL SAINTS' DAY
- 2 Commemoration of the Faithful Departed (All Souls' Day)
- 22 Cecilia, Martyr at Rome, c.230
- 23 Clement, Bishop of Rome, Martyr, c.100
- 25 Catherine of Alexandria, Martyr, 4th century
- 25 Isaac Watts, Hymn Writer, 1748
- 30 Andrew the Apostle

== December ==
- 3 Francis Xavier, Jesuit Missionary, Apostle of the Indies, 1552
- 6 Nicholas, Bishop of Myra, c.326
- 7 Ambrose, Bishop of Milan, Teacher of the Faith, 397
- 17 O SAPIENTIA
- 24 Christmas Eve
- 25 CHRISTMAS DAY
- 26 Stephen, Deacon, First Martyr
- 27 John, Apostle and Evangelist
- 28 The Holy Innocents
- 29 Thomas Becket, Archbishop of Canterbury, Martyr, 1170

== See also ==
- Calendar of saints (Anglican Church of Korea)
