= Calendar of saints (Episcopal Anglican Church of Brazil) =

The calendar of saints of the Episcopal Anglican Church of Brazil (Igreja Episcopal Anglicana do Brasil, IEAB) follows the tradition of The Episcopal Church (TEC), of which it was a missionary district until 1965.

== History ==
The most recent edition of the calendar, elaborated by IEAB's Liturgical Commission for the liturgical year which started on Advent Sunday (30 November 2014), tried to balance the number of male and female figures. In its 2021 edition, it began addressing God as "God Father and Mother".

== Characteristics ==
There is no single, unified calendar for the various provinces of the Anglican Communion; each makes its own calendar suitable for its local situation. As a result, the IEAB calendar contains some important figures in the history of Brazil, such as the Black warrior Zumbi dos Palmares, the Native warrior Sepé Tiaraju, and the environmentalist Chico Mendes. At the same time, there are figures from other provinces as well as post-Reformation Catholics, such as the religious sister Dulce de Souza Lopes Pontes.

The holy days are divided in principal feasts, festivals and lesser festivals. To settle any doubts regarding the sanctity of post-Reformed, un-canonized figures, all of them are commemorated in lesser Festivals, whose celebration is optional.

January

- January 24: Francis of Sales
- January 29: Andrei Rublev
- January 31: John Bosco

February

- February 7: Sepé Tiaraju
- February 12: Dorothy Stang

March

- March 13: Dulce de Souza Lopes Pontes
- March 24: Óscar Romero

June

- June 4: Pope John XXIII

July

- July 18: António Vieira
- July 20: Bartolomé de las Casas
- July 31: Ignatius of Loyola

August

- August 4: John Vianney
- August 27: Hélder Câmara

September

- September 5: Mother Teresa
- September 7: Independence Day
- September 27: Vincent de Paul

October

- October 15: Teresa of Ávila

November

- November 3: Martin de Porres
- November 20: Zumbi

December

- December 3: Francis Xavier
- December 10: Human Rights Day
- December 14: John of the Cross
- December 22: Chico Mendes
