= Calendar of saints (Anglican Church of Southern Africa) =

Anglican Church of Southern Africa calendar

The Anglican Church of Southern Africa has its own calendar of saints.

== History ==
The calendar of the Anglican Church of Southern Africa was published in 1989 in the book An Anglican Prayer Book 1989.

== See also ==
- Anglican Church of Southern Africa
- Liturgical Calendars of the Communion
