= Calendar of saints (Church of England) =

Liturgical year of the Church of England

The Church of England commemorates many of the same saints as those in the General Roman Calendar, mostly on the same days, but also commemorates various notable (often post-Reformation) Christians who have not been canonised by Rome, with a particular though not exclusive emphasis on those of English origin. There are differences in the calendars of other churches of the Anglican Communion (see Saints in Anglicanism).

The only person canonised in a near-conventional sense by the Church of England since the English Reformation is King Charles the Martyr (King Charles I), although he is not widely recognised by Anglicans as a saint outside the Society of King Charles the Martyr. The Church of England has no mechanism for canonising saints, and unlike the Roman Catholic Church it makes no claims regarding the heavenly status of those whom it commemorates in its calendar. For this reason, the Church of England avoids the use of the prenominal title "Saint" with reference to uncanonised individuals and is restrained in what it says about them in its liturgical texts. In order not to seem to imply grades of sanctity, or to discriminate between holy persons of the pre- and post-Reformation periods, the title "Saint" is not used at all in the calendar, even with reference to those who have always been known by that title, for example the Apostles.

No Old Testament figures are commemorated in the Church of England calendar, but the litany "Thanksgiving for the Holy Ones of God" (included in Common Worship: Times and Seasons on pp. 558–560, immediately after "The Eucharist of All Saints") includes ten names from before Christ, so they are presumably not excluded on principle, and could be considered among the saints.

The ninth Lambeth Conference held in 1958 clarified the commemoration of Saints and Heroes of the Christian Church in the Anglican Communion. Resolution 79 stated:

1. In the case of scriptural saints, care should be taken to commemorate men or women in terms which are in strict accord with the facts made known in Holy Scripture.
2. In the case of other names, the Calendar should be limited to those whose historical character and devotion are beyond doubt.
3. In the choice of new names economy should be observed and controversial names should not be inserted until they can be seen in the perspective of history.
4. The addition of a new name should normally result from a widespread desire expressed in the region concerned over a reasonable period of time.

There is no single calendar for the various churches making up the Anglican Communion; each makes its own calendar suitable for its local situation. As a result, the calendar here contains a number of figures important in the history of the English church. Calendars in different provinces will focus on figures more important to those different countries. At the same time, different provinces often borrow important figures from each other's calendars as the international importance of different figures becomes clear. In this way the calendar of the Church of England has importance beyond the immediate purpose of supporting the liturgy of the English Church. It is, for example, one of the key sources of the calendar for the international daily office Oremus.

Holy Days are variously categorised as Principal Feasts, Festivals, Lesser Festivals, or Commemorations. In order to minimise problems caused by the ambivalence regarding the manner of commemoration of uncanonised persons, all such days are Lesser Festivals or Commemorations only, whose observance is optional.

The following table lists the Holy Days in the calendar of Common Worship, the calendar most generally followed in the Church of England (though the calendar of the 1662 Book of Common Prayer is still authorised for use). This calendar was finalised in 2000, with some further names added in 2010. Individual dioceses and societies may suggest additional observances for local use, but these are not included here. The table includes the feast date, the name of the person or persons being commemorated, their title, the nature and location of their ministry or other relevant facts, and year of death, all in the form in which they are set out in the authorised Common Worship calendar. The level of the observance is indicated as follows:

- **boldface** denotes Principal Feasts and Principal Holy Days
- a dagger (†) denotes Festivals
- an asterisk (*) denotes Lesser Festivals
- italics denote unclassified observances
- entries with none of the above are Commemorations.

== Moveable dates ==
- †The Baptism of Christ, the Sunday following the Epiphany (when the Epiphany is kept on 6 January)
- **Ash Wednesday**, the Wednesday 46 days before Easter Day
- **Maundy Thursday**, the Thursday in the week before Easter Day
- **Good Friday**, the Friday in the week before Easter Day
- **Easter Day**, the first Sunday after the Paschal full moon
- **Ascension Day**, the Thursday forty days after Easter Day
- **Day of Pentecost**, the Sunday fifty days after Easter Day
- **Trinity Sunday**, the Sunday after Pentecost
- †The Day of Thanksgiving for the Institution of Holy Communion (Corpus Christi), the Thursday after Trinity Sunday
- †Dedication Festival, the first Sunday in October or the Last Sunday after Trinity, if date unknown
- †Christ the King, the Sunday next before Advent

== January ==
- 1 †The Naming and Circumcision of Jesus
- 2 *Basil the Great and Gregory of Nazianzus, Bishops, Teachers of the Faith, 379 and 389
- 2 Seraphim, Monk of Sarov, Spiritual Guide, 1833
- 2 Vedanayagam Samuel Azariah, Bishop in South India, Evangelist, 1945
- 6 **The Epiphany** – may be celebrated on the Sunday between 2 and 8 January
- 10 William Laud, Archbishop of Canterbury, 1645
- 11 Mary Slessor, Missionary in West Africa, 1915
- 12 Aelred of Hexham, Abbot of Rievaulx, 1167
- 12 Benedict Biscop, Abbot of Wearmouth, Scholar, 689
- 13 *Hilary, Bishop of Poitiers, Teacher of the Faith, 367
- 13 Kentigern (Mungo), Missionary Bishop in Strathclyde and Cumbria, 603
- 13 George Fox, Founder of the Society of Friends (the Quakers), 1691
- 17 *Antony of Egypt, Hermit, Abbot, 356
- 17 Charles Gore, Bishop, Founder of the Community of the Resurrection, 1932
- 18–25 Week of Prayer for Christian Unity
- 18 Amy Carmichael, Founder of the Dohnavur Fellowship, Spiritual Writer, 1951
- 19 *Wulfstan, Bishop of Worcester, 1095
- 20 Richard Rolle of Hampole, Spiritual Writer, 1349
- 21 *Agnes, Child Martyr at Rome, 304
- 22 Vincent of Saragossa, Deacon, first Martyr of Spain, 304
- 24 *Francis de Sales, Bishop of Geneva, Teacher of the Faith, 1622
- 25 †The Conversion of Paul
- 26 *Timothy and Titus, Companions of Paul
- 28 *Thomas Aquinas, Priest, Philosopher, Teacher of the Faith, 1274
- 30 *Charles, King and Martyr, 1649
- 31 John Bosco, Priest, Founder of the Salesian Teaching Order, 1888

== February ==
- 1 Brigid of Kildare, Abbess of Kildare, c.525
- 2 **The Presentation of Christ in the Temple (Candlemas)** – may be celebrated on the Sunday between 28 January and 3 February
- 3 *Anskar, Archbishop of Bremen, Missionary in Denmark and Sweden, 865
- 4 Gilbert of Sempringham, Founder of the Gilbertine Order, 1189
- 6 The Martyrs of Japan, 1597
- 10 Scholastica, sister of Benedict, Abbess of Plombariola, c.543
- 14 *Cyril and Methodius, Missionaries to the Slavs, 869 and 885
- 14 Valentine, Martyr at Rome, c.269
- 15 Sigfrid, Bishop, Apostle of Sweden, 1045
- 15 Thomas Bray, Priest, Founder of the SPCK and the SPG, 1730
- 17 *Janani Luwum, Archbishop of Uganda, Martyr, 1977
- 23 *Polycarp, Bishop of Smyrna, Martyr, c.155
- 27 *George Herbert, Priest, Poet, 1633

Alternative dates:

- Matthias may be celebrated on 24 February instead of 14 May.

== March ==
- 1 *David, Bishop of Menevia, Patron of Wales, c.601
- 2 *Chad, Bishop of Lichfield, Missionary, 672
- 7 *Perpetua, Felicity and their Companions, Martyrs at Carthage, 203
- 8 Edward King, Bishop of Lincoln, 1910*
- 8 Felix, Bishop, Apostle to the East Angles, 647
- 8 Geoffrey Studdert Kennedy, Priest, Poet, 1929
- 17 *Patrick, Bishop, Missionary, Patron of Ireland, c.460
- 18 Cyril, Bishop of Jerusalem, Teacher of the Faith, 386
- 19 †Joseph of Nazareth
- 20 *Cuthbert, Bishop of Lindisfarne, Missionary, 687
- 21 *Thomas Cranmer, Archbishop of Canterbury, Reformation Martyr, 1556
- 24 Walter Hilton of Thurgarton, Augustinian Canon, Mystic, 1396
- 24 Paul Couturier, Priest, Ecumenist, 1953
- 24 Óscar Romero, Archbishop of San Salvador, Martyr, 1980
- 25 **The Annunciation of Our Lord to the Blessed Virgin Mary**
- 26 Harriet Monsell, Founder of the Community of St John the Baptist, 1883
- 31 John Donne, Priest, Poet, 1631

Alternative dates:

- Chad may be celebrated with Cedd on 26 October instead of 2 March. Cuthbert may be celebrated on 4 September instead of 20 March.

== April ==
- 1 Frederick Denison Maurice, Priest, Teacher of the Faith, 1872
- 9 Dietrich Bonhoeffer, Lutheran Pastor, Martyr, 1945
- 10 *William Law, Priest, Spiritual Writer, 1761
- 10 William of Ockham, Friar, Philosopher, Teacher of the Faith, 1347
- 11 George Selwyn, first Bishop of New Zealand, 1878
- 16 Isabella Gilmore, Deaconess, 1923
- 19 *Alphege, Archbishop of Canterbury, Martyr, 1012
- 21 *Anselm, Abbot of Le Bec, Archbishop of Canterbury, Teacher of the Faith, 1109
- 23 †George, Martyr, Patron of England, c.304
- 24 Mellitus, Bishop of London, first Bishop at St Paul's, 624
- 24 The Seven Martyrs of the Melanesian Brotherhood, Solomon Islands, 2003
- 25 †Mark the Evangelist
- 27 Christina Rossetti, Poet, 1894
- 28 Peter Chanel, Missionary in the South Pacific, Martyr, 1841
- 29 *Catherine of Siena, Teacher of the Faith, 1380
- 30 Pandita Mary Ramabai, Translator of the Scriptures, 1922

== May ==
- 1 †Philip and James, Apostles
- 2 *Athanasius, Bishop of Alexandria, Teacher of the Faith, 373
- 4 *English Saints and Martyrs of the Reformation Era
- 8 *Julian of Norwich, Spiritual Writer, c.1417
- 12 Gregory Dix, Priest, Monk, Scholar, 1952
- 14 †Matthias the Apostle
- 16 Caroline Chisholm, Social Reformer, 1877
- 19 *Dunstan, Archbishop of Canterbury, Restorer of Monastic Life, 988
- 20 *Alcuin of York, Deacon, Abbot of Tours, 804
- 21 Helena, Protector of the Holy Places, 330
- 24 *John and Charles Wesley, Evangelists, Hymn Writers, 1791 and 1788
- 25 *The Venerable Bede, Monk at Jarrow, Scholar, Historian, 735
- 25 Aldhelm, Bishop of Sherborne, 709
- 26 *Augustine, first Archbishop of Canterbury, 605
- 26 John Calvin, Reformer, 1564
- 26 Philip Neri, Founder of the Oratorians, Spiritual Guide, 1595
- 28 Lanfranc, Prior of Le Bec, Archbishop of Canterbury, Scholar, 1089
- 30 *Josephine Butler, Social Reformer, 1906
- 30 Joan of Arc, Visionary, 1431
- 30 Apolo Kivebulaya, Priest, Evangelist in Central Africa, 1933
- 31 †The Visit of the Blessed Virgin Mary to Elizabeth

Alternative dates:

- Matthias may be celebrated on 24 February instead of 14 May.
- The Visit of the Blessed Virgin Mary to Elizabeth may be celebrated on 2 July instead of 31 May.

== June ==
- 1 *Justin, Martyr at Rome, c.165
- 3 The Martyrs of Uganda, 1885–7 and 1977
- 4 Petroc, Abbot of Padstow, 6th century
- 5 *Boniface (Wynfrith) of Crediton, Bishop, Apostle of Germany, Martyr, 754
- 6 Ini Kopuria, Founder of the Melanesian Brotherhood, 1945
- 8 *Thomas Ken, Bishop of Bath and Wells, Nonjuror, Hymn Writer, 1711
- 9 *Columba, Abbot of Iona, Missionary, 597
- 9 Ephrem of Syria, Deacon, Hymn Writer, Teacher of the Faith, 373
- 11 †Barnabas the Apostle
- 14 Richard Baxter, Puritan Divine, 1691
- 15 Evelyn Underhill, Spiritual Writer, 1941
- 16 *Richard, Bishop of Chichester, 1253
- 16 Joseph Butler, Bishop of Durham, Philosopher, 1752
- 17 Samuel and Henrietta Barnett, Social Reformers, 1913 and 1936
- 18 Bernard Mizeki, Apostle of the MaShona, Martyr, 1896
- 19 Sundar Singh of India, Sadhu (holy man), Evangelist, Teacher of the Faith, 1929
- 22 *Alban, first Martyr of Britain, c.250
- 23 *Etheldreda, Abbess of Ely, c.678
- 24 †The Birth of John the Baptist
- 27 Cyril, Bishop of Alexandria, Teacher of the Faith, 444
- 28 *Irenæus, Bishop of Lyon, Teacher of the Faith, c.200
- 29 †Peter and Paul, Apostles

Alternative dates:

- Peter the Apostle may be celebrated alone, without Paul, on 29 June.

== July ==
- 1 Henry, John, and Henry Venn the younger, Priests, Evangelical Divines, 1797, 1813 and 1873
- 3 †Thomas the Apostle
- 6 Thomas More, Scholar, and John Fisher, Bishop of Rochester, Reformation Martyrs, 1535
- 11 *Benedict of Nursia, Abbot of Monte Cassino, Father of Western Monasticism, c.550
- 14 *John Keble, Priest, Tractarian, Poet, 1866
- 15 *Swithun, Bishop of Winchester, c.862
- 15 Bonaventure, Friar, Bishop, Teacher of the Faith, 1274
- 16 Osmund, Bishop of Salisbury, 1099
- 18 Elizabeth Ferard, first Deaconess of the Church of England, Founder of the Community of St Andrew, 1883
- 19 *Gregory, Bishop of Nyssa, and his sister Macrina, Deaconess, Teachers of the Faith, c.394 and c.379
- 20 Margaret of Antioch, Martyr, 4th century
- 20 Bartolomé de las Casas, Apostle to the Indies, 1566
- 22 †Mary Magdalene
- 23 Bridget of Sweden, Abbess of Vadstena, 1373
- 25 †James the Apostle
- 26 Anne and Joachim, Parents of the Blessed Virgin Mary
- 27 Brooke Foss Westcott, Bishop of Durham, Teacher of the Faith, 1901
- 29 *Mary, Martha and Lazarus, Companions of Our Lord
- 30 *William Wilberforce, Social Reformer, Olaudah Equiano and Thomas Clarkson, Anti-Slavery Campaigners, 1833, 1797 and 1846
- 31 Ignatius of Loyola, Founder of the Society of Jesus, 1556

Alternative dates:

- The Visit of the Blessed Virgin Mary to Elizabeth may be celebrated on 2 July instead of 31 May.
- Thomas the Apostle may be celebrated on 21 December instead of 3 July.
- Thomas Becket may be celebrated on 7 July instead of 29 December.

== August ==
- 4 Jean-Baptiste Vianney, Curé d'Ars, Spiritual Guide, 1859
- 5 *Oswald, King of Northumbria, Martyr, 642
- 6 †The Transfiguration of Our Lord
- 7 John Mason Neale, Priest, Hymn Writer, 1866
- 8 *Dominic, Priest, Founder of the Order of Preachers, 1221
- 9 *Mary Sumner, Founder of the Mothers' Union, 1921
- 10 *Laurence, Deacon at Rome, Martyr, 258
- 11 *Clare of Assisi, Founder of the Minoresses (Poor Clares), 1253
- 11 John Henry Newman, Priest, Tractarian, 1890
- 13 *Jeremy Taylor, Bishop of Down and Connor, Teacher of the Faith, 1667
- 13 Florence Nightingale, Nurse, Social Reformer, 1910
- 13 Octavia Hill, Social Reformer, 1912
- 14 Maximilian Kolbe, Friar, Martyr, 1941
- 15 †The Blessed Virgin Mary
- 20 *Bernard, Abbot of Clairvaux, Teacher of the Faith, 1153
- 20 William and Catherine Booth, Founders of the Salvation Army, 1912 and 1890
- 24 †Bartholomew the Apostle
- 27 *Monica, mother of Augustine of Hippo, 387
- 28 *Augustine, Bishop of Hippo, Teacher of the Faith, 430
- 29 *The Beheading of John the Baptist
- 30 *John Bunyan, Spiritual Writer, 1688
- 31 *Aidan, Bishop of Lindisfarne, Missionary, 651

Alternative dates:

- The Blessed Virgin Mary may be celebrated on 8 September or 8 December instead of 15 August.

== September ==
- 1 Giles of Provence, Hermit, c.710
- 2 The Martyrs of Papua New Guinea, 1901 and 1942
- 3 *Gregory the Great, Bishop of Rome, Teacher of the Faith, 604
- 4 Birinus, Bishop of Dorchester (Oxon), Apostle of Wessex, 650
- 6 Allen Gardiner, Missionary, Founder of the South American Mission Society, 1851
- 8 *The Birth of the Blessed Virgin Mary
- 9 Charles Fuge Lowder, Priest, 1880
- 13 *John Chrysostom, Bishop of Constantinople, Teacher of the Faith, 407
- 14 †Holy Cross Day
- 15 *Cyprian, Bishop of Carthage, Martyr, 258
- 16 *Ninian, Bishop of Galloway, Apostle of the Picts, c.432
- 16 Edward Bouverie Pusey, Priest, Tractarian, 1882
- 17 *Hildegard, Abbess of Bingen, Visionary, 1179
- 19 Theodore of Tarsus, Archbishop of Canterbury, 690
- 20 *John Coleridge Patteson, First Bishop of Melanesia, and his Companions, Martyrs, 1871
- 21 †Matthew, Apostle and Evangelist
- 25 *Lancelot Andrewes, Bishop of Winchester, Spiritual Writer, 1626
- 25 Sergei of Radonezh, Russian Monastic Reformer, Teacher of the Faith, 1392
- 26 Wilson Carlile, Founder of the Church Army, 1942
- 27 *Vincent de Paul, Founder of the Congregation of the Mission (Lazarists), 1660
- 29 †Michael and All Angels
- 30 Jerome, Translator of the Scriptures, Teacher of the Faith, 420

Alternative dates:

- Cuthbert may be celebrated on 4 September instead of 20 March.

== October ==
- 1 Remigius, Bishop of Rheims, Apostle of the Franks, 533
- 1 Anthony Ashley Cooper, Earl of Shaftesbury, Social Reformer, 1885
- 3 George Bell, Bishop of Chichester, Ecumenist, Peacemaker, 1958
- 4 *Francis of Assisi, Friar, Deacon, Founder of the Friars Minor, 1226
- 6 *William Tyndale, Translator of the Scriptures, Reformation Martyr, 1536
- 9 Denys, Bishop of Paris, and his Companions, Martyrs, c.250
- 9 Robert Grosseteste, Bishop of Lincoln, Philosopher, Scientist, 1253
- 10 *Paulinus, Bishop of York, Missionary, 644
- 10 Thomas Traherne, Poet, Spiritual Writer, 1674
- 11 Ethelburga, Abbess of Barking, 675
- 11 James the Deacon, companion of Paulinus, 7th century
- 12 *Wilfrid of Ripon, Bishop, Missionary, 709
- 12 Elizabeth Fry, Prison Reformer, 1845
- 12 Edith Cavell, Nurse, 1915
- 13 *Edward the Confessor, King of England, 1066
- 15 *Teresa of Avila, Teacher of the Faith, 1582
- 16 Nicholas Ridley, Bishop of London, and Hugh Latimer, Bishop of Worcester, Reformation Martyrs, 1555
- 17 *Ignatius, Bishop of Antioch, Martyr, c.107
- 18 †Luke the Evangelist
- 19 *Henry Martyn, Translator of the Scriptures, Missionary in India and Persia, 1812
- 25 Crispin and Crispinian, Martyrs at Rome, c.287
- 26 *Alfred the Great, King of the West Saxons, Scholar, 899
- 26 Cedd, Abbot of Lastingham, Bishop of the East Saxons, 664
- 28 †Simon and Jude, Apostles
- 29 *James Hannington, Bishop of Eastern Equatorial Africa, Martyr in Uganda, 1885
- 31 Martin Luther, Reformer, 1546

Alternative dates:

- Chad may be celebrated with Cedd on 26 October instead of 2 March.

== November ==
- 1 **All Saints' Day**
- 2 *Commemoration of the Faithful Departed (All Souls' Day)
- 3 *Richard Hooker, Priest, Anglican Apologist, Teacher of the Faith, 1600
- 3 Martin of Porres, Friar, 1639
- 6 Leonard, Hermit, 6th century
- 6 William Temple, Archbishop of Canterbury, Teacher of the Faith, 1944
- 7 *Willibrord of York, Bishop, Apostle of Frisia, 739
- 8 *The Saints and Martyrs of England
- 9 Margery Kempe, Mystic, c.1440
- 10 *Leo the Great, Bishop of Rome, Teacher of the Faith, 461
- 11 *Martin, Bishop of Tours, c.397
- 13 *Charles Simeon, Priest, Evangelical Divine, 1836
- 14 Samuel Seabury, first Anglican Bishop in North America, 1796
- 16 *Margaret, Queen of Scotland, Philanthropist, Reformer of the Church, 1093
- 16 Edmund Rich of Abingdon, Archbishop of Canterbury, 1240
- 17 *Hugh, Bishop of Lincoln, 1200
- 18 *Elizabeth of Hungary, Princess of Thuringia, Philanthropist, 1231
- 19 *Hilda, Abbess of Whitby, 680
- 19 Mechthild, Béguine of Magdeburg, Mystic, 1280
- 20 *Edmund, King of the East Angles, Martyr, 870
- 20 Priscilla Lydia Sellon, a Restorer of the Religious Life in the Church of England, 1876
- 22 Cecilia, Martyr at Rome, c.230
- 23 *Clement, Bishop of Rome, Martyr, c.100
- 25 Catherine of Alexandria, Martyr, 4th century
- 25 Isaac Watts, Hymn Writer, 1748
- 29 Day of Intercession and Thanksgiving for the Missionary Work of the Church
- 30 †Andrew the Apostle

== December ==
- 1 Charles de Foucauld, Hermit in the Sahara, 1916
- 3 Francis Xavier, Jesuit Missionary, Apostle of the Indies, 1552
- 4 John of Damascus, Monk, Teacher of the Faith, c.749
- 4 Nicholas Ferrar, Deacon, Founder of the Little Gidding community, 1637
- 6 *Nicholas, Bishop of Myra, c.326
- 7 *Ambrose, Bishop of Milan, Teacher of the Faith, 397
- 8 †The Conception of the Blessed Virgin Mary
- 13 Lucy, Martyr at Syracuse, 304
- 13 *Samuel Johnson, Moralist, 1784
- 14 *John of the Cross, Poet, Teacher of the Faith, 1591
- 17 O Sapientia
- 17 Eglantine Jebb, Social Reformer, Founder of 'Save The Children', 1928
- 24 *Christmas Eve
- 25 **Christmas Day**
- 26 †Stephen, Deacon, First Martyr
- 27 †John, Apostle and Evangelist
- 28 †The Holy Innocents
- 29 *Thomas Becket, Archbishop of Canterbury, Martyr, 1170
- 31 John Wyclif, Reformer, 1384

Alternative dates:

- Thomas the Apostle may be celebrated on 21 December instead of 3 July.
- Thomas Becket may be celebrated on 7 July instead of 29 December.

== See also ==
- Calendar of saints (Episcopal Church in the United States of America)
- Coptic Orthodox calendar of saints
- List of saints
- Movable feasts
- Name days
- General Roman Calendar
- Calendar of saints
