= Elizabeth Ferard =

First deaconess of the Church of England

Elizabeth Catherine Ferard
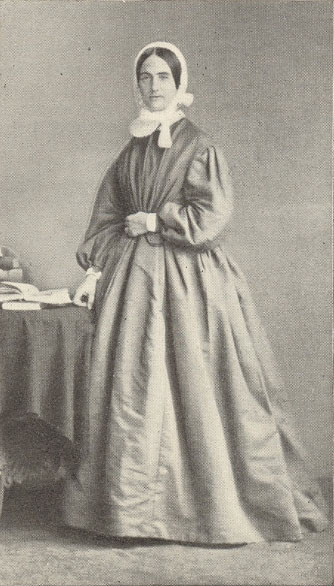
- Elizabeth Catherine Ferard, first deaconess of the Church of England

Deaconess, 1862
- Born: 22 February 1825; Bloomsbury, London
- Died: 18 April 1883; St Pancras, London
- Venerated in: Anglican Communion
- Feast: 18 July

Elizabeth Catherine Ferard (22 February 1825 – 18 April 1883) was a deaconess credited with revitalising the deaconess order in the Anglican Communion. She is now remembered in the Calendar of saints in some parts of the Anglican Communion on either 3 or 18 July.

== Early life ==
Ferard was a gentlewoman from a prominent Huguenot family. Her father, Daniel Ferard (1788–1839), was a solicitor.

Archibald Tait, then Bishop of London and later Archbishop of Canterbury, encouraged Elizabeth Ferard's religious vocation, particularly her visit to deaconess communities in Germany after the death of her invalid mother in 1858.

Although St. Paul mentioned deaconesses at Cenchreae, and St. John Chrysostom considered the model appropriate for both sexes, deaconesses vanished for hundreds of years until revived when Theodor Fliedner founded a deaconess community among Lutherans in Kaiserswerth, Germany in 1836. Episcopalians in Baltimore, Maryland, started similar work in circa 1855. The nineteenth century deaconess movement involved women living in community while carrying out traditional deacon ministries, especially teaching and serving the poor in industrialising cities.

In 1856, Ferard visited the deaconess community at Kaiserswerth. There, deaconesses taught girls and ministered to the sick; the institutions became as an alternative, practical and religious lifestyle for women, without becoming a nun.

== Career ==
With the help of a wealthy relative (Rev. Thomas Pelham Dale) and other benefactors, Ferard founded the North London Deaconess Institution in 1861, based at Burton Crescent (now Cartwright Gardens) near King's Cross, which became known as the London Diocesan Deaconess Institution in 1869, and then the Deaconess Community of St. Andrew in 1943. The first members of the institution were Ferard, Ellen Meredith and Anna Wilcox. The women dedicated themselves to the Church, to teach and care for the sick, but without taking formal vows. Ferard was commissioned a deaconess on 18 July 1862.

Ferard went on to found a community with the dual vocation of being deaconesses and religious sisters. She first worked in a poor parish in the King's Cross area of London, and moved to Notting Hill in 1873. She nursed and taught in Bloomsbury, Kings Cross, Somers Town and Notting Hill.

Resigning as head of the Diocesan Deaconess Institution in 1873 due to her own ill health, Ferard later ran a convalescent home for children in Redhill. She died at 16 Fitzroy Square in London on 18 April 1883.

== Legacy ==
The Community of St. Andrew still exists today, albeit forced to move to Westbourne Park, London in 1873 due to its growth and clearance of much of Somers Town for St Pancras railyards.

Isabella Gilmore (1842–1923), in the diocese of Rochester led an alternate style of deaconess life for she preferred a more parish-based model. The deaconess movement spread worldwide, to many American cities as well as South Africa, China, New Zealand and the Philippines, among other places. A similar secular and slightly later institution was Hull House, for which Jane Addams (1860–1935) won a Nobel Peace Prize.

Ferard died on 18 April 1883, but Anglicans celebrate the anniversary of her ordination, since the anniversary of her death often occurs during Holy Week. Sources differ as to whether her ordination occurred on 3 or 18 July 1862, and the earlier date is the feast of the apostle St. Thomas. Furthermore, references to her dying on Easter use the Julian calendar date for 1883, although most Westerners celebrated Easter on 25 March (Gregorian calendar) and Orthodox Christians on 29 April.

Elizabeth is remembered in the Church of England with a commemoration on 18 July.

In 1987, four Sisters of the Deaconess Community of St Andrew were ordained Deacon at Bristol and seven Sisters at London. Henceforth the community was known as the Community of St. Andrew. In 1994, three of those Deacons were ordained as Priests.
