= Matthias the Apostle =

Apostle of Jesus (died circa AD 80)

Saint Matthias the Apostle
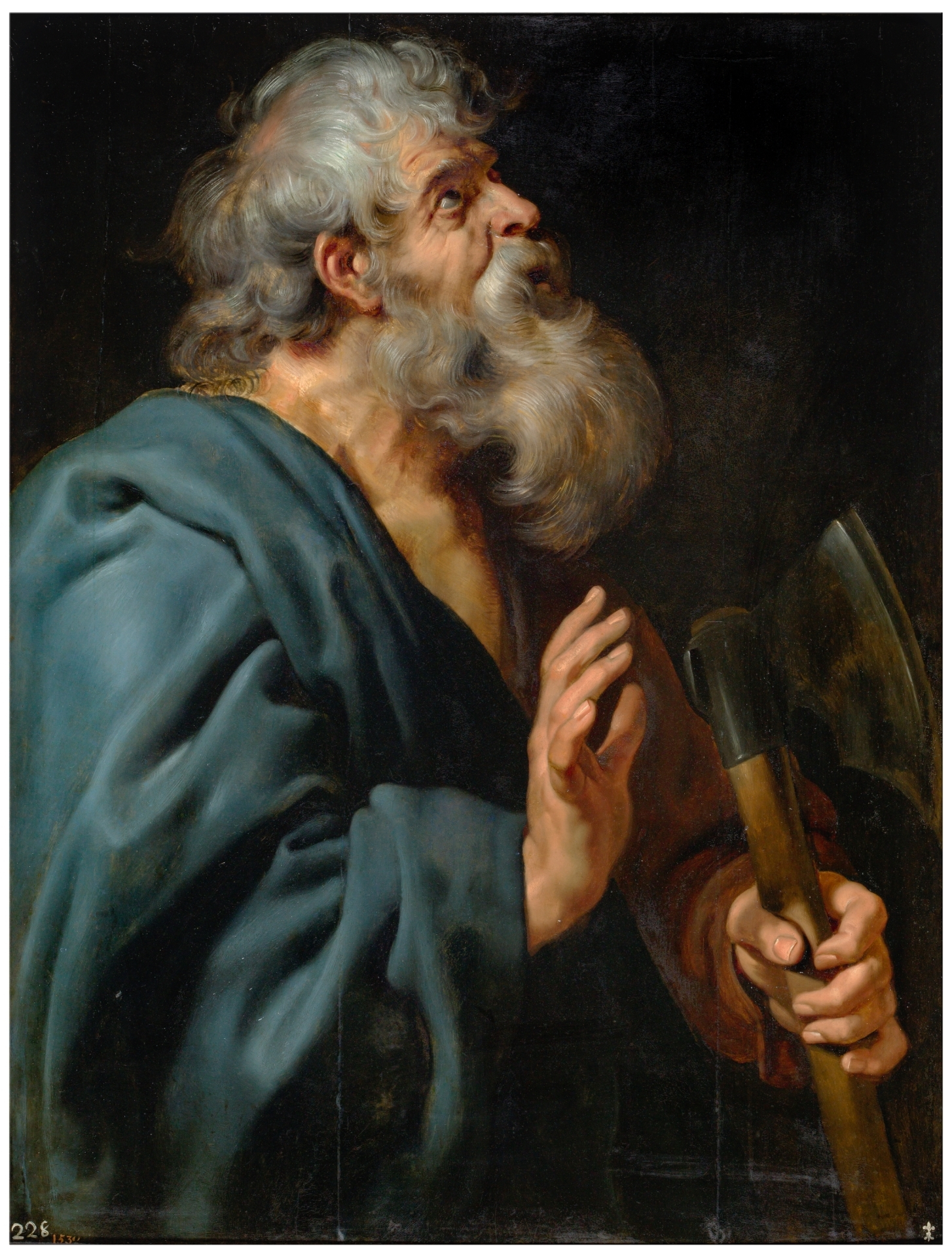
- St Matthias by Peter Paul Rubens, c. 1611

Apostle and Martyr Disciple of the Seventy
- Born: c. 1st century AD; Judaea, Roman Empire
- Died: c. 80 AD; Jerusalem, Judaea or Colchis
- Venerated in: All Christian denominations that venerate saints
- Canonized: Pre-congregation
- Feast: 14 May (Roman Catholic Church and Aglipayan Church, some places in Anglican Communion and Lutheranism); 9 August (Eastern Orthodox Church and Assyrian Church of the East); 24 February (in leap years 25 February) (pre-1970 General Roman Calendar, Western Rite Orthodoxy, Oriental Orthodox Church, Anglican Communion, Episcopal Church, some places in Lutheranism)
- Attributes: Axe, Christian martyrdom
- Patronage: Alcoholics; carpenters; tailors; Great Falls-Billings, Montana; Trier; smallpox; hope; perseverance

Matthias (/məˈθaɪəs/; Koine Greek: Μαθθίας, Matthías [maθˈθi.as], from Hebrew מַתִּתְיָהוּ Mattiṯyāhū; Coptic: ⲙⲁⲑⲓⲁⲥ; born c. 1st century AD - died c. AD 80) was an apostle in Christianity. According to the Acts of the Apostles, he was chosen by God through the remaining apostles to replace Judas Iscariot following the latter's betrayal of Jesus and his subsequent death. His calling as an apostle is unique, in that he was, despite having known Jesus throughout the latter's earthly history, selected via the casting of lots following Jesus' ascension to heaven.

== Biography ==
There is no mention of a Matthias among the lists of disciples or followers of Jesus in the three synoptic gospels, or the gospel of John, but according to Acts, he had been with Jesus from His baptism by John until Jesus's Ascension. In the days following, Peter proposed that the assembled disciples, who numbered about 120, nominate two men to replace Judas. They chose Joseph called Barsabbas (whose surname was Justus) and Matthias. Then they prayed, "Thou, Lord, which knowest the hearts of all [men], shew whether of these two Thou hast chosen, that he may take part of this ministry and apostleship, from which Judas by transgression fell, that he might go to his own place." Then they cast lots, and the lot fell to Matthias; so he was numbered with the eleven apostles.

No further information about Matthias is to be found in the canonical New Testament. Even his name is variable: the Syriac version of Eusebius calls him throughout not Matthias but "Tolmai", not to be confused with Bartholomew (which means Son of Tolmai), who was one of the twelve original Apostles; Clement of Alexandria refers once to Zacchaeus in a way which could be read as suggesting that some identified him with Matthias; the Clementine Recognitions identify him with Barnabas; Adolf Bernhard Christoph Hilgenfeld thinks he is the same as Nathanael in the Gospel of John.

== Martyrdom ==
St. Matthias was brought before the council of high elders as a "seducer" for preaching Christ as the son of God. Matthias, inspired by the Holy Ghost demonstrated with firm argument that he whom they crucified to a cross was the Son of God. Enraged, they sentenced him to be stoned alive. They seized him and cast him out the city to carry on the punishment. The enraged Jews cast many stones at him until a Roman Soldier beheaded him while he was half dead. Barsabbas prayed for them before he died.

Tradition maintains that Matthias was stoned at Jerusalem by the Jews, and then beheaded (cf. Tillemont, Mémoires pour servir à l'histoire eccl. des six premiers siècles, I, 406–7). It is said that St. Helena brought the relics of St. Matthias to Rome, and that a portion of them was at Trier. Bollandus* (Acta SS., May, III) doubts if the relics that are in Rome are not rather those of the St. Matthias who was Bishop of Jerusalem about the year 120, and whose history would seem to have been confounded with that of the Apostle.

— Catholic Encyclopedia (1911)

== Ministry and death ==
All information concerning the ministry and death of Matthias is vague and contradictory. The tradition of the Greeks says that St. Matthias spread Christianity around Cappadocia and on the coasts of the Caspian Sea, residing chiefly near the port Hyssus.

According to Nicephorus (Historia eccl., 2, 40), Matthias first preached the Gospel in Judaea, then in Aethiopia (by the region of Colchis, now in modern-day Georgia) and was crucified. An extant Coptic Acts of Andrew and Matthias, places his activity similarly in "the city of the cannibals" in Aethiopia. (Note: The Ethiopia/Aethiopia mentioned here as well as in the quote from the "Synopsis of Dorotheus" is that region identified with an ancient Egyptian military colony in the Caucasus mountains on the river Alazani.) A marker placed in the ruins of the Roman fortress at Gonio (Apsaros) in the modern Georgian region of Adjara claims that Matthias is buried at that site.

The Synopsis of Dorotheus contains this tradition: "Matthias preached the Gospel to barbarians and meat-eaters in the interior of Ethiopia, where the sea harbor of Hyssus is, at the mouth of the river Phasis. He died at Sebastopolis, and was buried there, near the Temple of the Sun."

Alternatively, another tradition maintains that Matthias was stoned at Jerusalem by the local populace, and then was beheaded (cf. Tillemont, Mémoires pour servir à l'histoire ecclesiastique des six premiers siècles, I, 406–07). According to Hippolytus of Rome, Matthias died of old age in Jerusalem.

Clement of Alexandria observed (Stromateis vi.13.):

Not that they became apostles through being chosen for some distinguished peculiarity of nature, since also Judas was chosen along with them. But they were capable of becoming apostles on being chosen by Him who foresees even ultimate issues. Matthias, accordingly, who was not chosen along with them, on showing himself worthy of becoming an apostle, is substituted for Judas.

== Writings ==
Surviving fragments of the lost Gospel of Matthias attribute it to Matthias, but Early Church Fathers attributed it to heretical writings in the 2nd century.

== Veneration ==
The feast of Saint Matthias was included in the Roman Calendar in the 11th century and celebrated on the sixth day to the Calends of March (24 February usually, but 25 February in leap years). In the revision of the General Roman Calendar in 1969, his feast was transferred to 14 May, so as not to celebrate it in Lent but instead in Eastertide close to the Solemnity of the Ascension, the event after which the Acts of the Apostles recounts that Matthias was selected to be ranked with the Twelve Apostles.

The Church of England's Book of Common Prayer, as well as other older common prayer books in the Anglican Communion, celebrates Matthias on 24 February. According to the newer Common Worship liturgy, Matthias is remembered in the Church of England with a Festival on 14 May, although he may be celebrated on 24 February, if desired. In the Episcopal Church as well as some in the Lutheran Church, including the Lutheran Church–Missouri Synod and the Lutheran Church–Canada, his feast remains on 24 February. In Evangelical Lutheran Worship, used by the Evangelical Lutheran Church in America as well as the Evangelical Lutheran Church in Canada, the feast date for Matthias is on 14 May.

It is claimed that St Matthias the Apostle's remains were brought to Italy through Empress Helena, mother of Emperor Constantine I (the Great); part of these relics were interred in the Abbey of Santa Giustina, Padua, and the remaining in the Abbey of St. Matthias, Trier, Germany. According to Greek sources, the remains of the apostle are buried in the castle of Gonio-Apsaros, Georgia.

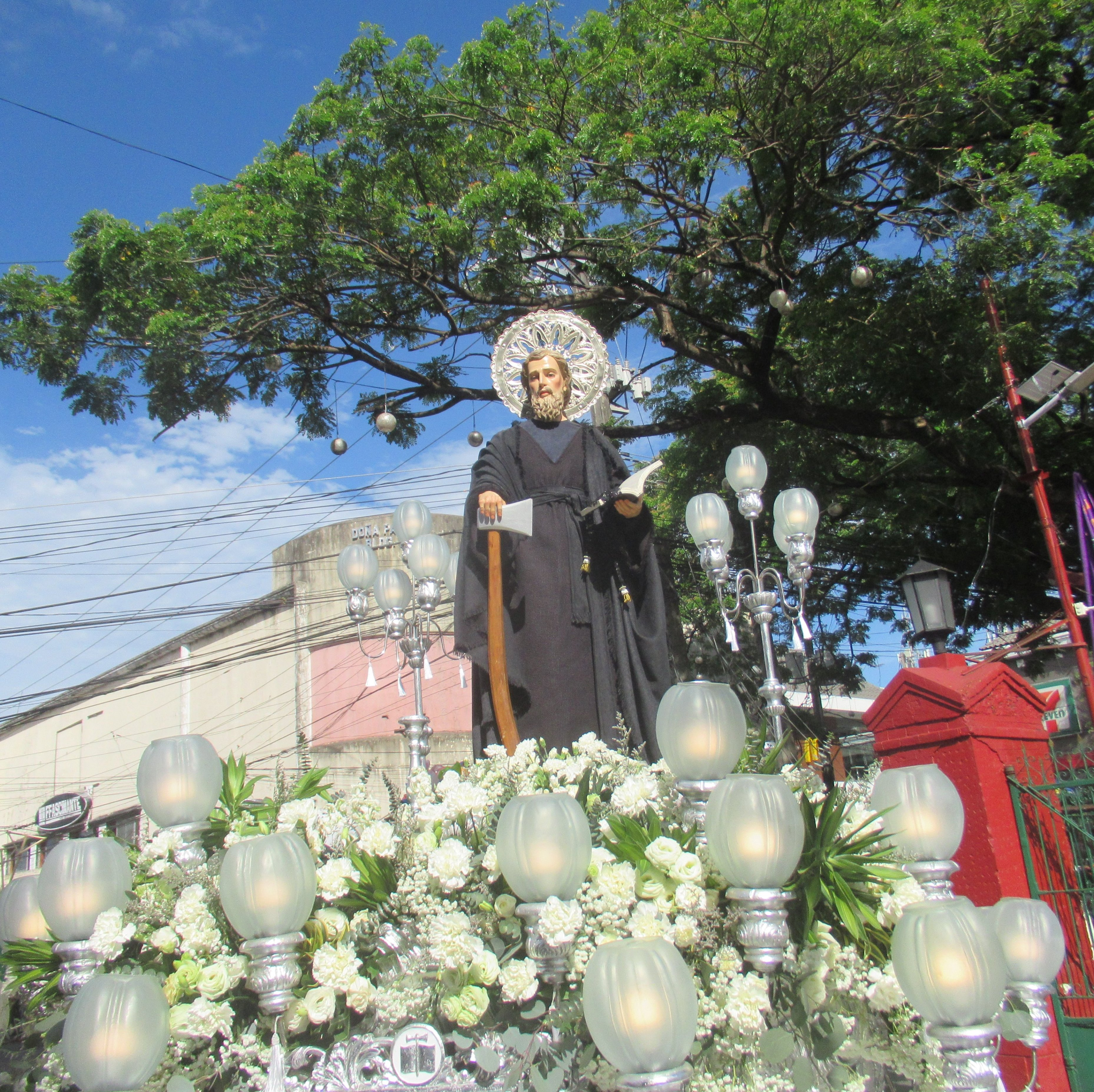
Saint Matthias (Good Friday processions in Baliwag, 1863)

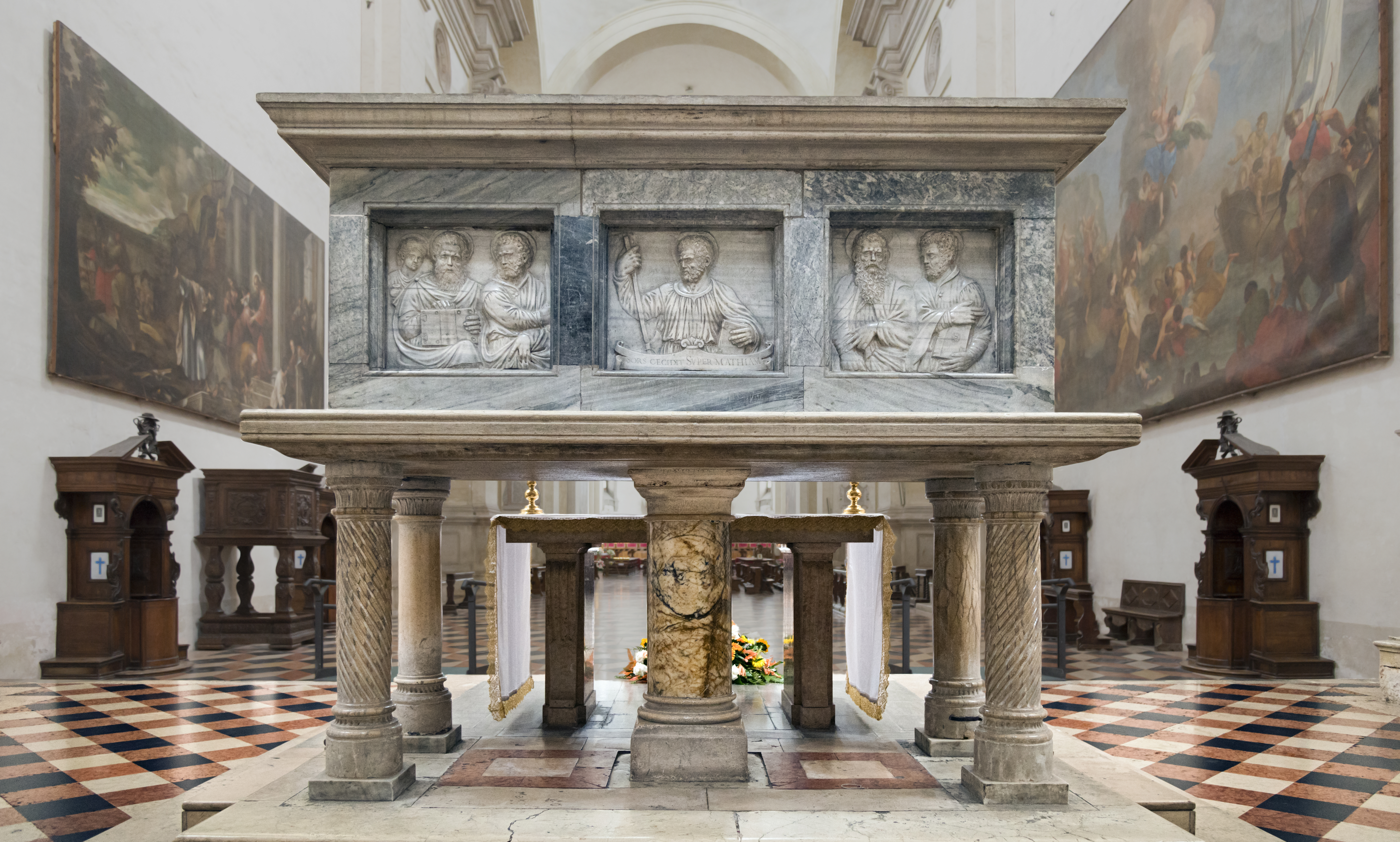
His reliquary in Padua

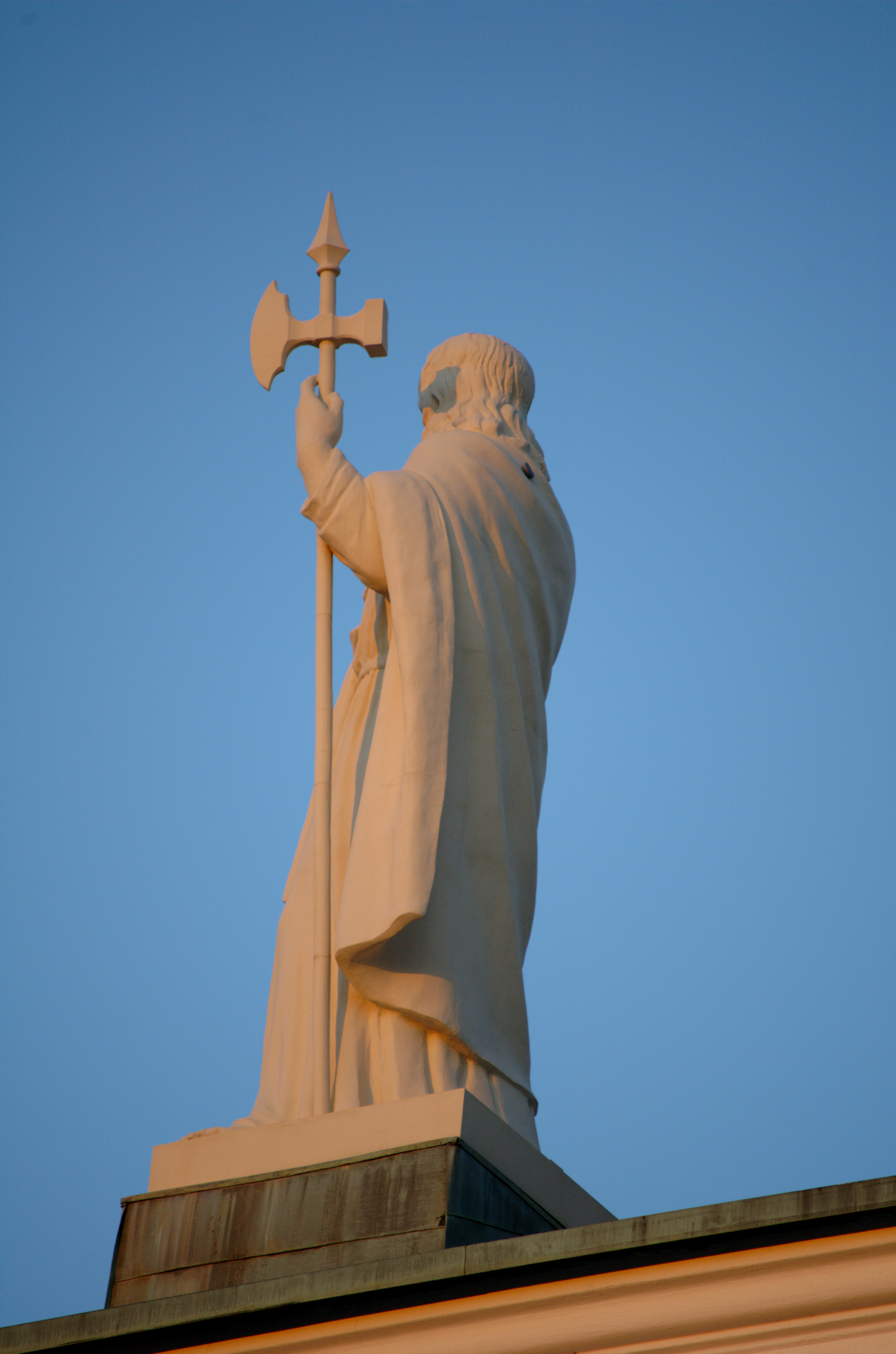
Statue of Saint Matthias by Hermann Schievelbein at the roof of the Helsinki Cathedral

== See also ==
- Acta Andreae et Matthiae apud Anthropophagos
