= Amy Carmichael =

Christian missionary to India (1867–1951)

Amy Beatrice Carmichael
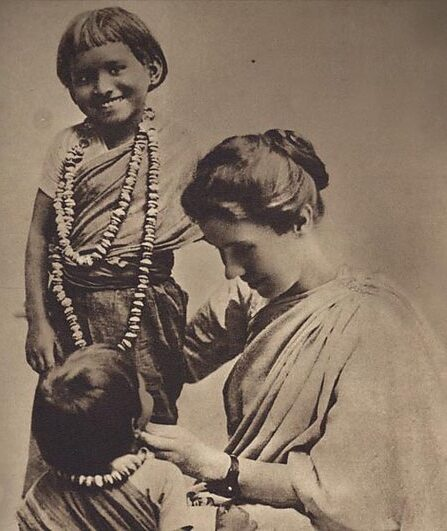
- Amy Carmichael with children in India
- Born: 16 December 1867; Millisle, County Down, Ireland
- Died: 18 January 1951 (aged 83); Dohnavur, Tamil Nadu, India
- Venerated in: Anglican Communion
- Feast: 18 January

Amy Beatrice Carmichael (16 December 1867 – 18 January 1951) was an Irish Christian missionary in India who opened an orphanage and founded a mission in Dohnavur. She served in India for 55 years and wrote 35 books about her work as a missionary.

== Early life ==
Amy Beatrice Carmichael, born in the small village of Millisle, County Down, Ireland, in 1867, as the oldest of seven siblings. Her parents were David Carmichael, a miller, and his wife Catherine, both devout Christians. Amy attended Harrogate Ladies College for four years in her youth.

Amy's father moved the family to Belfast when she was 16 years old, but he died two years later. In Belfast, the Carmichaels founded the Welcome Evangelical Church. In the mid-1880s, Carmichael started a Sunday-morning class for the 'Shawlies' (mill girls who wore shawls instead of hats) in the church hall of Rosemary Street Presbyterian. This mission grew quickly to include several hundred attendees. At this time Amy saw an advertisement in The Christian for an iron hall that could be erected for £500 and would seat 500 people. Two donations, £500 from Miss Kate Mitchell and one plot of land from a mill owner, led to the erection of the first "Welcome Hall", on the corner of Cambrai Street and Heather Street in 1887.

Amy continued at the Welcome until she received a call to work among the mill girls of Manchester in 1889, from which she moved on to overseas missionary work, despite suffering from neuralgia. At the Keswick Convention of 1887, she heard Hudson Taylor, founder of the China Inland Mission (CIM), speak about missionary life; soon afterwards, she became convinced of her calling to missionary work. She applied to the CIM and lived in London at the training house for women, where she met author and missionary to China Mary Geraldine Guinness, who encouraged her to pursue missionary work. Carmichael was ready to sail for Asia, but she was told that her health made her unfit for the work. She postponed her missionary career with the CIM and decided later to join the Church Missionary Society.

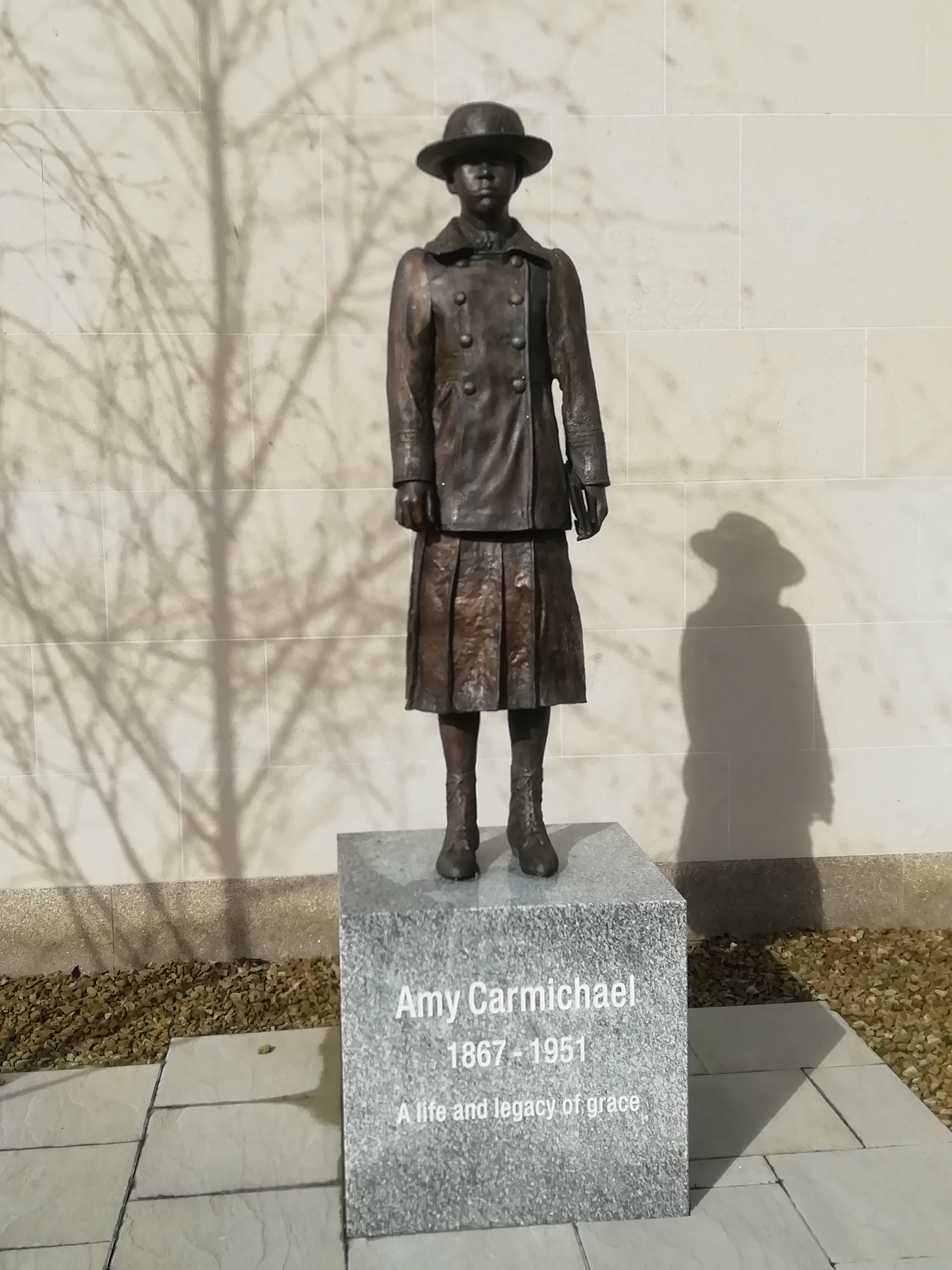
The bronze statue of Amy Carmichael as a young girl that stands in Hamilton Road in Bangor, County Down, Northern Ireland, on the grounds of the Presbyterian church.

== Work in India ==
Initially Carmichael traveled to Japan, staying for fifteen months, but returned home for health reasons. After a brief period of service in Ceylon (Sri Lanka), she went to Bangalore, India, for her health, where she chose to stay to continue her work as a missionary. She was commissioned by the Church of England Zenana Mission. Carmichael's most notable work was with girls and young women, some of whom were rescued from customs that amounted to forced prostitution

Carmichael founded the Dohnavur Fellowship in 1901 to continue her work, as she later wrote in The Gold Cord (1932). Dohnavur is situated in Tamil Nadu, thirty miles from India's southern tip. The name derives from Count Dohna, who initially funded German missionaries at the site in the early 19th century, on which the Rev. Thomas Walker then established a school. Carmichael's fellowship transformed Dohnavur into a sanctuary for over one thousand children. Carmichael often said that her ministry of rescuing temple children started with a girl named Preena. Having become a temple servant against her wishes, Preena managed to escape. Amy Carmichael provided her shelter, thus beginning her new ministry.

In an attempt to respect Indian culture, members of the Dohnavur organization wore Indian dress and gave the rescued children Indian names. Carmichael herself dressed in Indian clothes and dyed her skin with dark coffee. While serving in India, Carmichael received a letter from a young lady who was considering life as a missionary, asking, "What is missionary life like?" Carmichael wrote back, "Missionary life is simply a chance to die."

In 1912, money and workers were available that helped fund a hospital at Dohnavur. By 1913, the Dohnavur Fellowship was serving 130 girls. In 1918, Dohnavur added a home for young boys, many born to the former temple prostitutes. Meanwhile, in 1916 Carmichael formed a Protestant religious order called Sisters of the Common Life.

== Legacy ==
Amy Carmichael was a prolific writer, publishing many books and articles about her experiences as a missionary in India.

Temple prostitution was outlawed in India in 1948.

Carmichael died in India in 1951 at the age of 83. She asked that no stone be put over her grave at Dohnavur.

Other Christian missionaries have cited her as an influence.

The Dohnavur Fellowship continues the ministry, now supporting approximately 500 people on 400 acres with 16 nurseries and a hospital. The foundation is now run by Indians under the jurisdiction of the C.S.I. Tirunelveli Diocese, founded in 1896. Changed policies acknowledging Indian law require that all children born in or brought to Dohnavur be sent out for education in the 6th grade. Furthermore, since 1982, infant boys have been adopted out rather than remaining in the community.

Amy is remembered in the Church of England with a commemoration on 18 January.

Carmichael College in Morayfield, City of Moreton Bay, Queensland, Australia is named after her.

== Selected works ==
- From Sunrise Land: Letters from Japan, Marshall (1895)
- From fight (1901)
- Raisins (1901)
- Things as they are; mission work in southern India, London: Morgan and Scott (1905)
- Overweights of Joy (1906)
- Beginning of a Story (1908)
- Lotus Buds, London: Morgan and Scott (1912)
- Continuation of a Story (1914)
- Walker of Tinnevelly, London: Morgan & Scott (1916) (biography of Thomas Walker)
- NorScrip (1922)
- Ragland, pioneer, Madras: S.P.C.K. Depository (1922) (biography of Thomas Gajetan Ragland)
- Made in the Pans (1917)
- Ponnammal: Her Story (1918)
- From the Forest (1920)
- Dohnavur Songs (1921)
- Tables in the Wilderness (1923)
- The Valley of Vision (1924)
- Mimosa: A True Story (1924), CLC Publications (September 2005)
- Raj (1926)
- The Widow of the Jewels (1928)
- Meal in a Barrel (1929)
- Gold Cord (1932), Christian Literature Crusade (June 1957)
- Rose from Brier (1933), Christian Literature Crusade (June 1972)
- Ploughed Under: The Story of a Little Lover, Society for Promoting Christian Knowledge (SPCK) (1934)
- Gold by Moonlight (1935)
- Towards Jerusalem (1936)
- Windows (1937)
- If (1938), Christian Literature Crusade (June 1999) If...
- Figures of the True (1938)
- Pools and the Valley of Vision (1938)
- Kohila: The Shaping of an Indian Nurse (1939), CLC Publications (July 2003
- His Thoughts Said...His Father Said (1941)
- Though the Mountains Shake, Madras: Diocesan Press (1943)
- Before the Door Shuts (1948)
- This One Thing (1950)
- Edges of His Ways, Fort Washington: Christian Literature Crusade (1955) Edges of His ways : selections for daily reading
- Wings (with Florence Margaret Spencer Palmer; 1960)
- Thou Givest, They Gather, Thou givest-- they gather CLC Publications (June 1970)
- Candles in the Dark, Christian Literature Crusade (June 1982)
- Mountain Breezes: The Collected Poems of Amy Carmichael, Christian Literature Crusade (August 1999)
- Whispers of His Power, CLC Publications (June 1993) Whispers of His power
- That Way and No Other, Plough Publishing (January 2020) https://www.plough.com/en/topics/faith/discipleship/that-way-and-no-other
