= Allen Francis Gardiner =

English navy officer and missionary

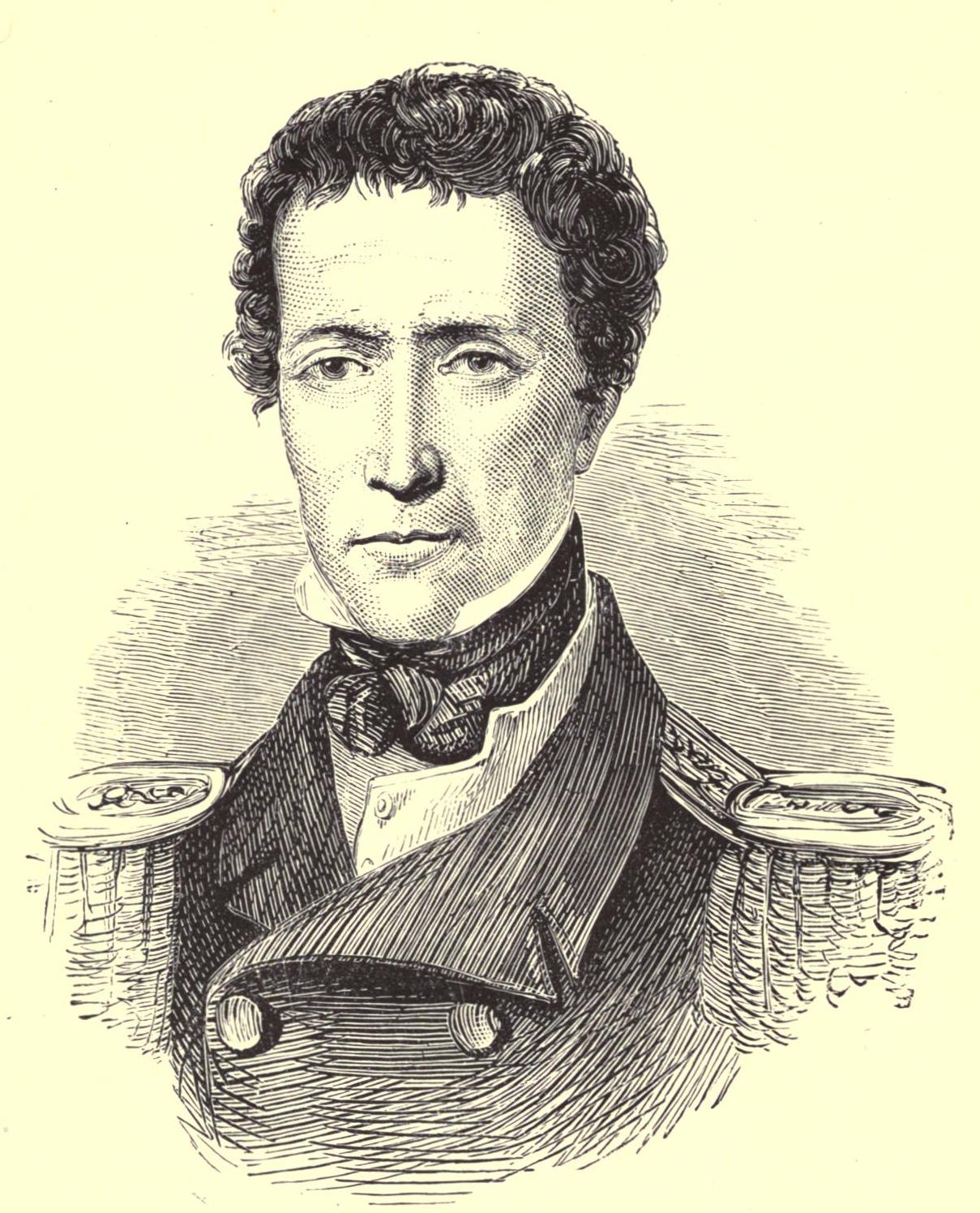
- Born: 28 January 1794; Basildon, Berkshire, England
- Died: 1851 (aged 56–57)
- Education: Royal Naval College
- Occupations: Royal Navy officer, missionary
- Spouses: Julia Susanna (m. 1823; died 1834) Elizabeth Lydia (m. 1836)

Allen Francis Gardiner was a British missionary and Royal Navy officer.

== Biography ==
Gardiner was the fifth son of Samuel Gardiner of Coombe Lodge, Oxfordshire, by Mary, daughter of Charles Boddam of Capel House, Bull's Cross, Enfield, Middlesex. He was born on 28 January 1794 in the parsonage house at Basildon, Berkshire, where his parents were temporarily residing. He was religiously educated, and in May 1808 entered the Royal Naval College, Portsmouth.

=== Naval career ===
On 20 June 1810 he went to sea as a volunteer on board HMS Fortunee. He next served on HMS Phoebe as a midshipman during the War of 1812 until August 1814. He distinguished himself in the capture of the American frigate Essex, and was sent to England as acting lieutenant of that prize. Being confirmed as lieutenant on 13 December, he served in the frigate HMS Ganymede in the Mediterranean Fleet, then in Leander, and Dauntless in various parts of the world.

He returned invalided to Portsmouth on 31 October 1822.

As second lieutenant of Jupiter, Gardiner was at Newfoundland in 1824, and in 1825 returned to England in charge of Clinker. He was promoted to commander on 13 September 1826. After that, although he often applied for positions in the Royal Navy, he never succeeded in obtaining another appointment.

On 1 July 1823, Gardiner married Julia Susanna, second daughter of John Reade and his wife of Ipsden House, Ipsden, Oxfordshire. They had several children together including one son, Allen W. Gardiner. Not all his daughters survived to adulthood. Julia Gardiner died in the Isle of Wight on 23 May 1834.

About two years later, Gardiner married secondly, on 7 October 1836, Elizabeth Lydia, eldest daughter of the Rev. Edward Garrard Marsh, vicar of Aylesford, Kent.

=== Work ===
Long interested in the missionary work being done in non-Christian populations, after the death of one of his daughters, he decided to enter that field. With this view Gardiner went to Africa in 1834. Exploring the Zulu country, he started the first mission near the Tongaat river.

From 1838 to 1843, Gardiner laboured among the indigenous peoples of Chile, and went from island to island in the Indian Archipelago (now called Tierra del Fuego). His efforts were foiled by the opposition of the various governments.

Gardiner's first visit to Tierra del Fuego took place 22 March 1842, when, coming from the Falkland Islands in the schooner Montgomery, he landed in Oazy harbour. He appealed to the Church Missionary Society to send missionaries to Patagonia, but was declined for lack of funds to support such a distant endeavour. Similarly, he appealed to the Wesleyan and London Missionary societies.

In 1844 a special society was formed for South America, which took the name of the Patagonian Missionary Society. Robert Hunt, a schoolmaster, was sent out as the first missionary and accompanied by Gardiner. They were unable to establish a mission and returned to England in June 1845. Gardiner departed England again 23 September 1845, and, in company with Federico Gonzales, a Spanish Protestant, from whom he learnt Spanish, went to Bolivia. They distributed Bibles to the Indian population, but were strongly opposed by the Roman Catholics, who were the predominant Christian group in the country.

He established Gonzales as a missionary at Potosi, and returned to England, landing at Southampton on 8 February 1847. The next year he sailed to Tierra del Fuego, where he surveyed the islands with a view to a mission, and suffered great hardships. He tried to interest the Moravian Brethren and the Foreign Missions of the Church of Scotland in this enterprise, but neither could render any aid. He proposed that a mission should be established on a substantial ship, rather than trying to set up one on land. At last, a lady at Cheltenham having given £700, the mission was determined on.

Accompanied by Richard Williams, surgeon; Joseph Erwin, ship-carpenter; John Maidment, catechist; and three Cornish fishermen, Pearce, Badcock, and Bryant, Gardiner sailed from Liverpool on 7 September 1850 in Ocean Queen. The party landed at Picton Island on 5 December. He had with him two launches, each 26 feet (7.9 m) long, in which had been stowed provisions to last for six months. The Yahgan people were hostile, the climate severe, and the country barren. The party were also hindered by failures such as the devastating realisation that they had left nearly all their shot on the ship, leaving them unable to hunt for fresh food. Six months elapsed without the arrival of additional supplies, which were detained at the Falkland Islands for want of a vessel. After relocating to Spaniard Harbour on the southeast coast of the main island, the unfortunate men gradually died of starvation. Gardiner, the last survivor, is believed to have died on 6 September 1851.

On 21 October the vessel John Davison arrived to resupply the group, and found all the men dead. On 6 January 1852 HMS Dido visited the place, but all the sailors could do was to bury the bodies and bring away Gardiner's journal. Two years later in 1854, Allen Gardiner, an 88-ton schooner named for him, was sent out to Patagonia as a British missionary ship. In 1856 Allen W. Gardiner, the captain's only son, went to that country as a missionary.

== Commemoration ==
An islet in the Chilean group of islands which includes Picton island remains named after Gardiner. The street in Durban named in his honour, was later renamed Dorothy Nyembe Street, to honour a South African activist and as part of the city's renaming process.

Allen Gardiner is remembered in the Church of England with a commemoration on 6 September.

== Publications ==
His works include:

1. The Friend of Australia: Or, a Plan for Exploring the Interior and for Carrying on a Survey of the Whole Continent of Australia. Smith, Elder and Company. 1836. with Thomas J. Maslin
2. Narrative of a Journey to the Zoolu Country in South Africa: Undertaken in 1835. William Crofts. 1836.
3. A visit to the Indians on the frontiers of Chili. London: Seeley and Burnside. 1840.
4. The Voice of pity for South America [afterw.] A Voice for South America. London: Wertheim, Mackintosh & Hunt.

== See also ==
- Port Famine

== Notes and references ==
- Boase, George C. (1889). "Gardiner, Allen Francis" . In Stephen, Leslie (ed.). Dictionary of National Biography. Vol. 20. London: Smith, Elder & Co. pp. 409, 410.
- Devenish, George (9 July 2014). "Missionary and martyr". The Witness.
- Every, Edward Francis (1915). "The South American Missionary Society". London: Society for Promoting Christian Knowledge. Archived from the original on 29 September 2007.
- Marsh, John William; Stirling (Bishop of the Falkland Islands), Waite Hockin (1887). The Story of Commander Allen Gardiner: R.N., with Sketches of Missionary Work in South America. J. Nisbet & Company.
- O'Byrne, William Richard (1849). "Gardiner, Allen Francis" . A Naval Biographical Dictionary . John Murray – via Wikisource.
- Watson, Robert George Theodor (1960). Tongaati: an African experiment. Hutchinson.
