= William Parker Snow =

Arctic explorer, writer and mariner

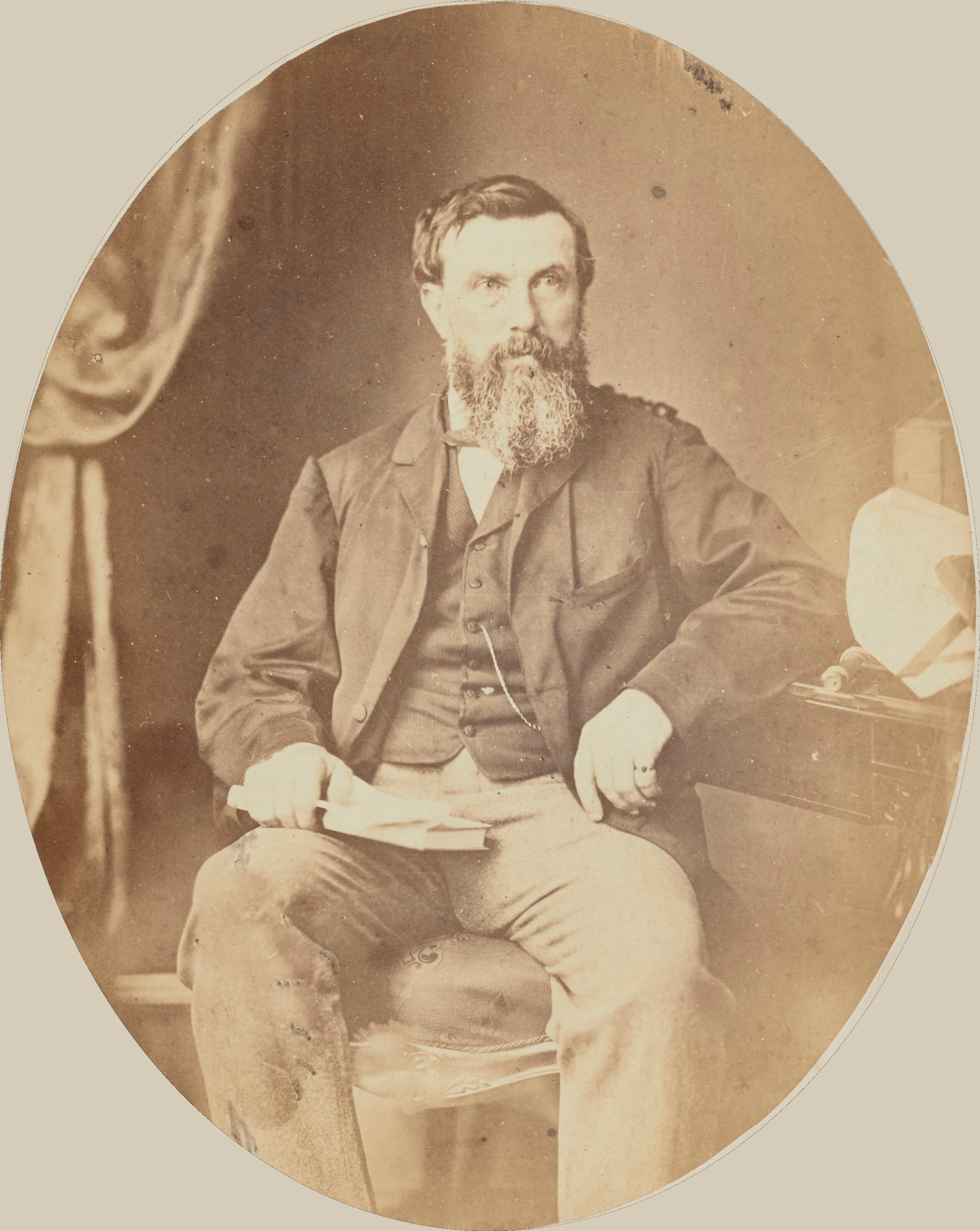
Snow in 1867

William Parker Snow (27 November 1817 – 12 March 1895) was an Arctic explorer, writer and mariner. He wrote several books on his expeditions including the Voyage of the Prince Albert under Sir John Franklin. He served as captain on the Allen Gardiner on its voyage to Patagonia in 1855.

== Early life ==
William Parker Snow was born at Poole, England, on 27 November 1817. He was the eldest son of Lieutenant William John Snow (1788–1827), a veteran of the Napoleonic Wars and War of 1812, and Harriet née Parker (1802–1835), a descendant of Oliver Cromwell. After his father's death in 1827, Snow attended the Royal Naval College at Greenwich. In 1833, he was apprenticed to the merchant marine, making his first two voyages to India and later voyages to New South Wales and the Dutch East Indies. He was flogged twice a week by one of his captains which made him resolve to leave the merchant navy. Snow spent a brief period in the Royal Navy on board the Cherokee-class brig-sloop HMS Griffon and was one of the prize crew of the slaver Don Francisco captured off Dominica in 1837.

Snow married a London housemaid, Sarah Williams, in 1839 and was consequently ostracised by his family. The couple emigrated to Melbourne where they managed a hotel in 1840. He also ran a club in Italy but these enterprises failed. Returning prematurely to England due to ill health. He made an attempt to organise a return to Australia with three other young people including his younger sister and her husband (his wife's brother) but failed, and he was convicted of swindling in 1842 and jailed for a year.

After his release, the Snows became reconciled with his stepfather and they spent some years in Europe, where William Parker Snow worked for some time as librarian at the Baths of Lucca in Tuscany. Here he wrote his first book, a guide to the baths, in 1846. On returning to England, he performed editorial and transcription work for William Johnson Neale and Lord Thomas Babington Macaulay.

== Siblings ==
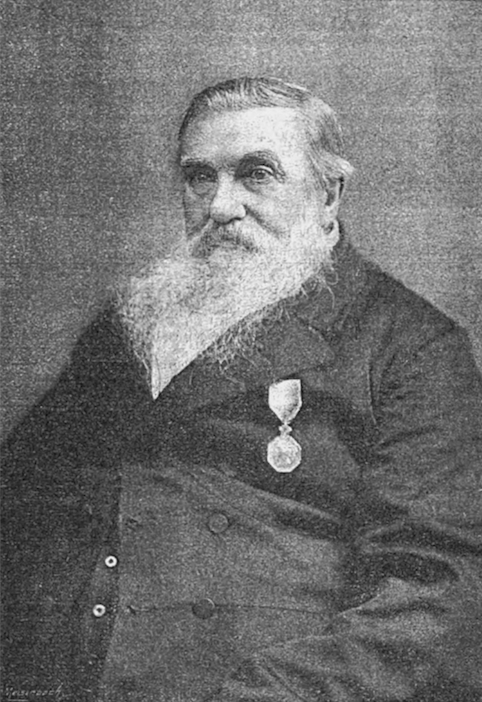

A sister, Ellen Susannah Snow, became Mrs John Williams and died late in 1841 or early in 1842, aged about 16. A brother, George Henry Joel Snow (c. 1826–1904) was also a mariner, but spent his final years as a market gardener in Victoria, Australia.

== Searching for Sir John Franklin ==
On 7 January 1850, Snow was working as a writer in New York when he claimed to have had a paranormal vision of the whereabouts of the missing Arctic expedition of Sir John Franklin. He immediately wrote to Lady Jane Franklin with a plan for a search. Consequently, she made him the civil officer of her expedition on board the ketch Prince Albert that explored the Boothia Peninsula for any sign of the missing expedition between June and September 1850, without success. On his return, Snow wrote Voyage of the Prince Albert in Search of Sir John Franklin, which Lady Franklin used to promote further expeditions.

Unable to secure a position on any of the other expeditions then searching for Franklin, late in 1852 the Snows sailed for Melbourne, where he organised a new expedition intending to cross the Pacific and pass eastwards from the Bering Strait. He purchased the 15-ton cutter Thomas in Melbourne for his expedition. Early June 1853, with A. Drummond Fenwick "next to himself in command" so far as Sydney, his steward and his wife, Snow left Melbourne for Sydney from where, after further alterations were made to the vessel, he sailed for the Arctic on 30 June 1853, accompanied by his wife and a crew of four. Storm damage and problems with his men forced him to enter the Clarence River, New South Wales, a month later, and the expedition was ultimately abandoned.

== Patagonian mission ==
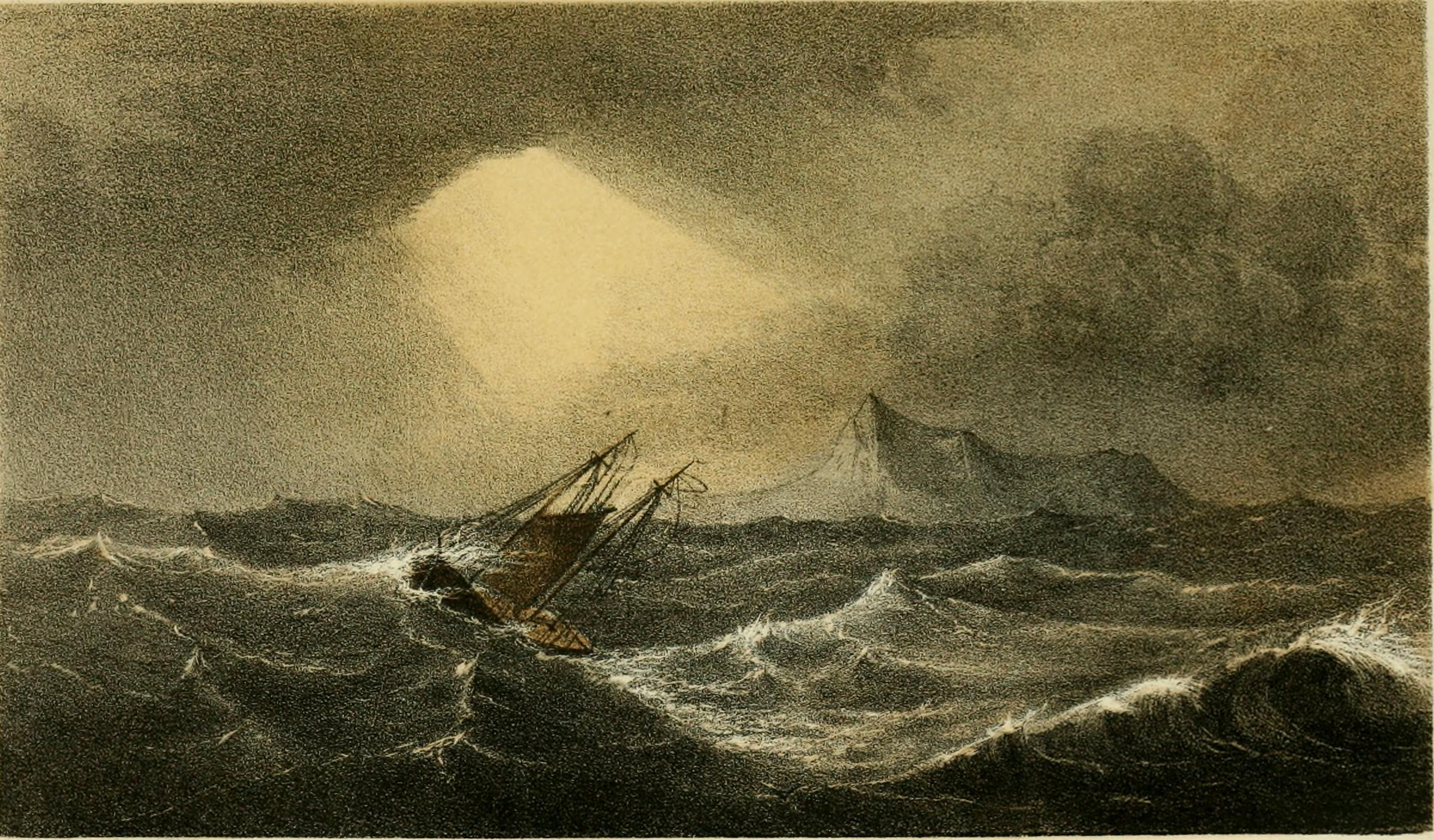
The Allen Gardiner at Cape Horn in 1855

On his return to England, Snow became master of the Patagonian Missionary Society's schooner Allen Gardiner, which sailed for Keppel Island in the Falkland Islands on 24 October 1854. His most important achievement was discovering the location of the Tierra del Fuego native Jemmy Button in November 1855.

Disagreements with the society's management saw him sacked by the newly arrived missionary George Pakenham Despard in September 1856. In the aftermath, his wife suffered a nervous breakdown from which she never recovered. Snow published a successful book, A Two Years' Cruise off Tierra del Fuego, the Falkland Islands, Patagonia and in the River Plate: A Narrative of Life in the Southern Seas, in 1857, but ultimately lost a lengthy legal case for compensation for wrongful dismissal against his former employers. He correctly predicted that the society's method of operation would result in a massacre by the natives. He became reconciled with his former employer's successor, the South American Missionary Society, in the mid-1880s.

== Aborted searches for the Franklin Expedition ==
In 1857, Lady Franklin employed Snow as a travelling lecturer in support of her expedition using the auxiliary steamship Fox, which returned with confirmation of the tragic fate of the missing expedition in 1859. Snow immediately promoted a new expedition seeking the lost expedition's scientific records that were believed to have been buried under a cairn or in Sir John Franklin's grave. He acquired a small schooner, Triumver, which he renamed Endeavour, but a series of delays, ill-health and inadequate funds saw the expedition abandoned early in 1862, before it could leave Liverpool.

Snow then proposed another overland expedition from Canada and travelled to New York, where he was soon in contact with Charles Francis Hall, who had been exploring the Canadian Arctic in much the way Snow had earlier planned. They planned another expedition while Snow edited Hall's account of his expedition, Arctic Researches and Life Amongst the Esquimaux, for the publishers Harper Brothers. Lack of finances and disagreements between the two men saw their expedition with its own 95-ton schooner Active aborted, and Hall left with a small, land-based expedition on the whaler Monticello in July 1864. Snow remained in New York writing and lecturing.

Snow had presented an interesting relic to be interred in President Abraham Lincoln's coffin. In the 26 April 1865 New York Herald Page 1 Column 4, was the following article: "Captain Parker Snow, the distinguished commander of the Arctic and Antarctic exploring expeditions, presented to Gen. Dix, with a view of their being interred in the coffin of the President, some interesting relics of Sir John Franklin's ill fated expedition. They consisted of a tattered leaf of a Prayer Book, on which the first word legible was the word "Martyr," and a piece of fringe and some portions of uniform. These suggestive relics, which are soon to be buried out of sight, were found in a boat lying under the head of a human skeleton."

== Literary career ==
While living in New York, Snow compiled his most successful book, on the military leaders of the Confederate States of America, first published as Southern Generals, Who They Are, and What They Have Done in 1865, being reprinted in at least two revised editions with slightly varying titles including Southern Generals, Their Lives and Campaigns (1866) and Lee and his Generals. Returning to England in 1867, Snow continued writing and publishing on diverse subjects until almost the day he died. His efforts met with mixed success and the last two decades of his life were spent in genteel poverty, aided by a small pension and donations from friends. He died at London on 12 March 1895, his Polar Medal being placed on his grave.

Snow was a complex person – quick to take offence in the face of authority, litigious and prone to paranoia. These characteristics led to the failure of many of his projects. However, to many observers he genuinely tried to do good for others, often causing himself legal and financial distress. He supported many good causes, including services to the poor in London and marine safety, including the efforts of Samuel Plimsoll and proposals for harbours of refuge and a system of linked floating relief stations around the globe. Though describing himself as a conservative, he publicly supported many radical causes including that of the Tichborne Claimant, Arthur Orton. His writings, preserved in several public collections including the Royal Geographical Society (London) and Mitchell Library (Sydney), include many valuable observations, especially on the native peoples of Australia, the Arctic and Patagonia.

== Bibliography ==
- The “Patagonian Missionary Society,” and Some Truths Connected with It, William Parker Snow
- Southern Generals, Who They Are, and What They Have Done (1865)

== Other sources ==
- The New York Herald, 26 April 1865, Page 1, Column 4, "Interesting Relics"
- The Geographical Journal, Royal Geographical Society, 1895, (obituary by the President C. R. Markham)
- A. G. E. Jones, William Parker Snow, in Falkland Islands Journal, 1979.
- William Barr, Searching for Franklin from Australia: William Parker Snow's Initiative of 1853, in Polar Record, Vol. 33, No. 185, 1997 (pp. 147–150).
- Hazlewood, Nick (2000). Savage: The Life and Times of Jemmy Button. London: Hodder & Staughton. ISBN 0-340-73911-8.
- W. Gillies Ross, Clairvoyants and Mediums Search for Sir John Franklin, in Polar Record, Vol. 39, No. 1, January 2003, (pp. 1–18).
- McGoogan, Ken (2006). Lady Franklin's Revenge: A True Story of Ambition, Obsession and the Remaking of Arctic History. London: Bantam Books. ISBN 0-553-81643-8.
