= Diario Romano =

The Diario Romano (Italian for Roman Diary) was a booklet published annually at Rome, with papal authorisation, giving the routine of feasts and fasts to be observed in Rome and the ecclesiastical functions to be performed in the city.

== Literature ==
- Camillo Cybo (ed.): Diario Romano dell' anno MDCCXXX, Rom 1730. (Scan by Google Books)
