= Allen Gardiner (schooner) =

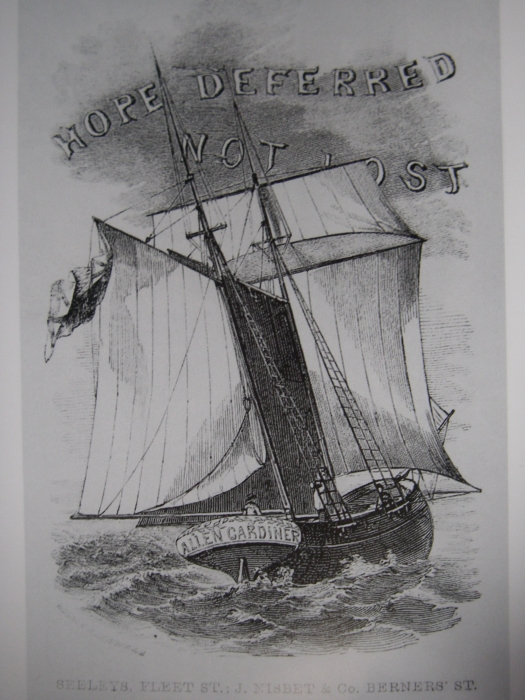
Schooner Allan Gardiner

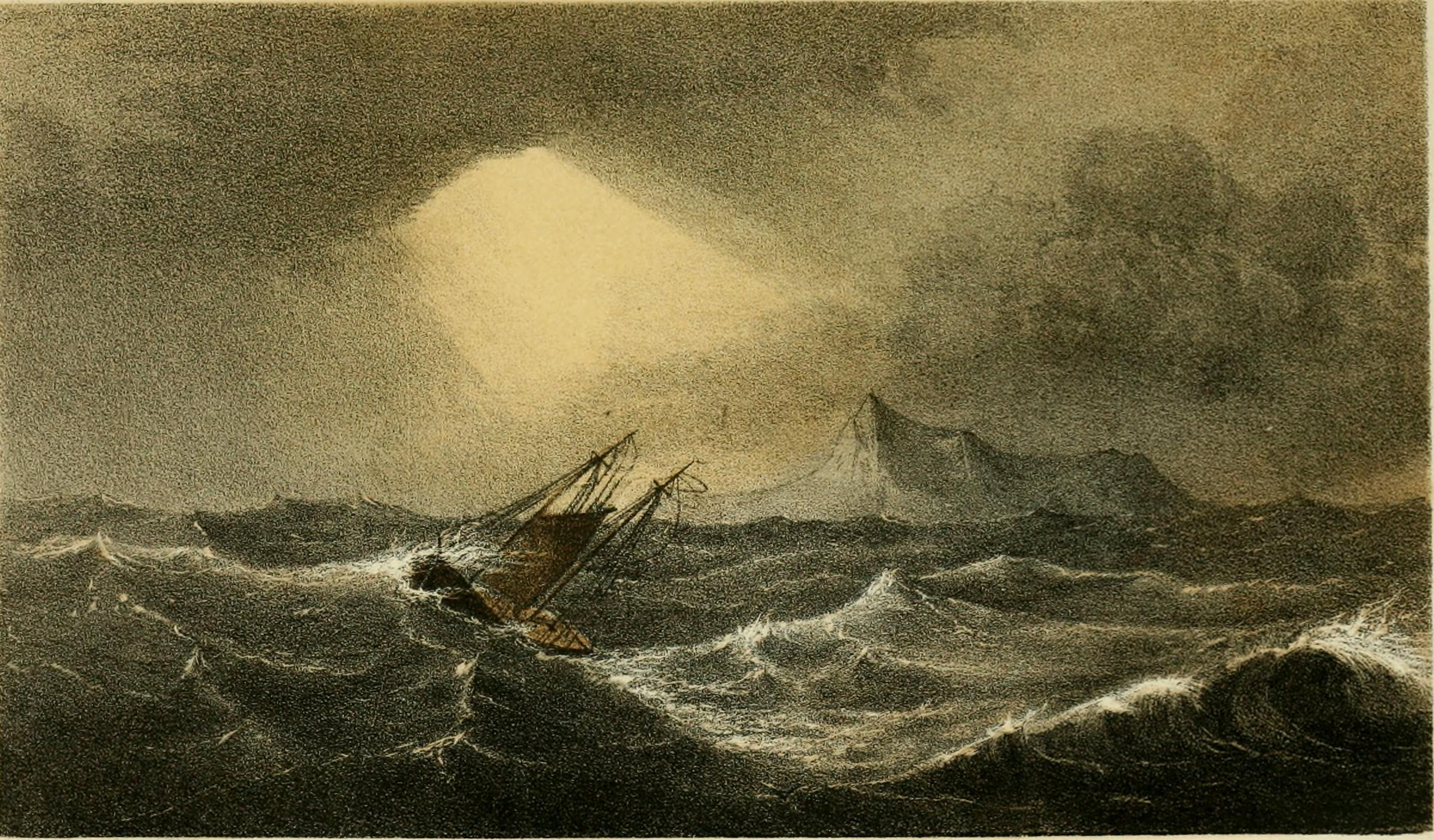
The Allen Gardiner at Cape Horn in 1855

Allen Gardiner was a schooner owned by the South American Mission Society, based in England. Built in 1854, the schooner was named after Captain Allen Gardiner, the founder of the society. He had died of starvation with the rest of his mission party at Spaniard Bay on the SE coast of the main island of Tierra del Fuego in 1852, after resupply was delayed.

The schooner was sailed to Keppel Island, Falklands, to support the missionary effort there and in Tierra del Fuego. In the fall of 1858, it was used to return some Yahgan natives to Wulaia after their months-long visit on Keppel. After the ship did not return, the missionary society sent out the Nancy to try to discover what had happened. In 1860, the captain and crew found one British survivor at Wulaia. They learned that the captain and the rest of the crew of the Gardiner were all killed by the Yahgan on 1 November 1859, after a conflict. SAMS withdrew for some time from trying to establish a mission in Tierra del Fuego, but one was established in 1871.

== Massacre ==
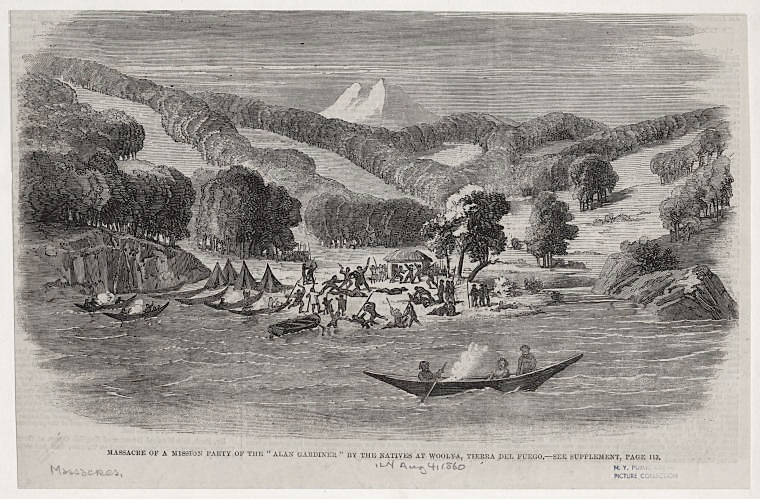
Wulaia Massacre, in London Illustrated News

In 1858 Allen Gardiner was used to return a Yahgan family to Wulaia, and it brought others to Keppel Island to study with missionaries. Homesick, they departed after several months in October 1858, again on the Gardiner. The idea had been to educate the Yahgan in English and Christianity. They and the British suffered serious cultural misunderstandings. When the Allen Gardiner failed to return to Keppel Island, Captain William Horton Smyley was sent to Tierra del Fuego in 1860 on the ship Nancy to investigate. Smyley discovered the ship afloat at Wulaia, but stripped of all valuable possessions. He learned from the one survivor, the cook, that Captain Fell, four mates, two seamen, and the catechist, Garland Philips, were all killed by Yahgan while on shore on 6 November 1859.

The ship's cook and sole survivor of the massacre, Alfred Cole, was rescued by Captain Smyley. Cook later described the attack:

One of the sailors complained to Captain Fell that several articles belonging to the crew had been stolen. Captain Fell gave orders for the [natives'] bundles to be searched. When the bundles were examined, the missing property was found in them and returned to its rightful owners.

The Yahgan natives were angered by the search. While on board the ship, one attacked the captain, grasping him by the throat. Captain Fell threw off the man and sent all the Yahgan on the ship to shore. On 6 November 1859, Yahgan men attacked and killed Fell and most of the crew while they were holding church services on shore. The cook of the ship claimed that the attack was led by Jemmy Button but he denied any role in this.

== Wreck ==
On 10 August 1893, Allen Gardiner, under command of Captain Robert Thompson, was seriously damaged during a storm. Captain Thompson was found to have acted wrongly by attempting to sail the ship in poor conditions. He received "severe censure".

== See also ==
- Martin Gusinde Anthropological Museum, includes history of Stirling House
