= Principal Holy Day (Anglicanism) =

Principal Holy Days are a type of observance in the Anglican Communion, including the Church of England. All Principal Feasts are also Principal Holy Days. All Principal Holy Days share equal status; however those which are not Principal Feasts, being fast days within the season of Lent, lack a festal character. They are considered to be the most significant type of observance, the others being Festivals, Lesser Festivals, and Commemorations. Observance of Principal Holy Days is considered obligatory.

== Principal Holy Days (other than Principal Feasts) in the Church of England ==
- Ash Wednesday
- Maundy Thursday
- Good Friday

== Church of Ireland ==
The Church of Ireland recognises ten principal feast days and holy days.

The principal holy days are:

- Christmas Day
- Epiphany
- the Presentation of Christ
- Maundy Thursday
- Good Friday
- Easter Day
- Ascension Day
- Pentecost (Whitsunday)
- Trinity Sunday
- All Saints’ Day

== See also ==
- List of Anglican Church calendars
- Principal Feast
- Festival (Anglicanism)
- Lesser Festival
- Commemoration (observance)
