= South American Mission Society =

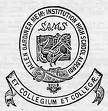

The South American Mission Society was founded at Brighton in 1844 as the Patagonian Missionary Society, sometime referred to as the Patagonian Mission. Captain Allen Gardiner, R.N., was the first secretary. The name was retained for twenty years, until South American Mission Society was adopted. The name of the organisation was changed after the death of Captain Gardiner, who died of starvation in 1851 on Picton Island in South America, waiting for a supply ship from England. Gardiner thought that the original mission should be expanded from southern South America (Patagonia) to all of South America. Charles Darwin is reported to have supported the society financially and rhetorically.

The society's purpose was to recruit Christian missionaries, send them to and support them in, South America. There were nationally based SAMS organisations in Britain, Ireland, Canada, Australia, New Zealand and the United States but during the 1990s those in Australia and New Zealand were merged with the Church Missionary Society in those countries. In 2009 the 'mother' society in Britain was merged with CMS. SAMS was one of the early members of Faith2Share, the international network of mission agencies, and the SAMS organisations in Ireland, Canada and the US continue to play an active role within that network.

== Captain Gardiner's attempts ==
Commencing in 1838, Captain Allen Gardiner made several attempts to bring Protestant Christianity to the native peoples of South America. Returning to England in 1843 he sought support for his efforts; no British church or missionary society offered to help, so he founded the Patagonian Missionary Society. His first effort to set up a mission at Gregory Bay in the Straits of Magellan in 1845 was repulsed by the natives. He worked in Bolivia in 1845–1847, but that mission effort was suppressed by the Catholic clergy.

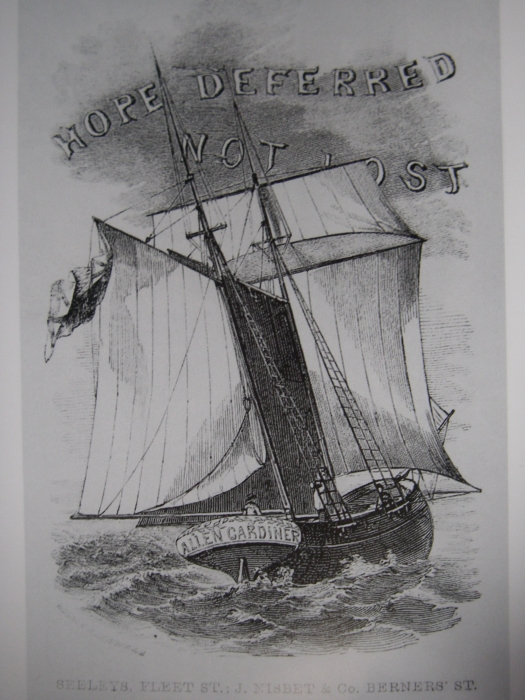
Illustration of the schooner Allen Gardiner.

Gardiner organized another effort through the Society. With four sailors and a carpenter, he left Cardiff on the Clymene on 7 January 1848. They landed at Picton Island in Tierra del Fuego on 23 March. After being harassed by the natives, Gardiner's party re-boarded the ship. It sailed for Valparaíso on 1 April and they eventually returned to England.

Based on these experiences, Captain Gardiner decided that to be successful, he needed a small seaworthy vessel as a base from which he could approach the natives with some degree of security. The Reverend George Pakenham Despard of Redlands, Bristol was appointed honorary secretary of the Patagonian Missionary Society in March 1850. With his organisational skill the society obtained donations, but not enough to build the 120-ton schooner Gardiner wanted. Two 26-foot launches, Pioneer and Speedwell, were built for his use in the islands.

Gardiner and six other men were landed at Picton Island on 5 December 1850. After again failing to engage with the Fuegians, and beset by planning failures and mishaps (such as leaving all their shot behind), by March 1851 they had fled the island, sailing east along the Beagle Channel to Spaniard Harbour, a bay at the mouth of Cooks River. By September, all had died of starvation, the delivery of fresh stores organised by the society in England having also been delayed.

== The schooner Allen Gardiner ==
In Britain, Captain Gardiner and his party were lauded as martyrs, and donations to the Patagonian Missionary Society poured in. There was sufficient money to build a schooner of the type that Gardiner had originally wanted. The keel was laid down at Kelly's yards, Dartmouth, on 1 November 1853 and she was launched as the Allen Gardiner on 11 July 1854: a vessel of 89 tons register on dimensions of 64.0 x 17.2 x 10.6 ft. She sailed from Bristol on 24 October 1854, under the command of Captain William Parker Snow. No missionary having been employed at this stage, the party included a catechist James Garland Phillips, a doctor James A. Ellis, a mason and a carpenter. They established a settlement named Cranmer at Keppel Island in the Falkland Islands.

The mission suffered many difficulties, due at least in part to disagreements Captain Snow had with Phillips, his crew, and Governor George Rennie, who did not support the Society's intention to encourage Tierra del Fuegians to leave their own islands to be taught at Cranmer. The first missionary engaged in England, the Reverend E. A. Verity, was arrested on bankruptcy charges shortly before he was to leave England. Captain Snow offered to take Phillips on a reconnaissance voyage to Tierra del Fuego in October 1855, and they made amicable contacts with natives at several locations culminating in the discovery of Jemmy Button at Wulaia on 1 November. They also reburied the remains of Captain Gardiner and his party.

In December 1855 George Packenham Despard, the honorary secretary, was appointed missionary and arrived at Port Stanley in the Falkland Islands on 30 August 1856. Here disagreements with the captain of the Allen Gardiner came to a head, and he was dismissed. Snow returned to England, where he sued the Society for unlawful dismissal, but ultimately lost. Despite this the Society received considerable criticism of its actions, in part because at this point in its history, it was still a private organisation that was not attached to any of the established churches.

== The Wulaia Massacre ==
George Packenham Despard managed to convince Jemmy Button, one of his wives and three children to visit Cranmer, and after many months there they were returned to Wulaia in December 1858. At the same time a party of nine Fuegians were encouraged to visit to Cranmer. This party, without any of Button's previous European experiences, soon became home-sick and, in addition, there were serious cultural misunderstandings between them and the Europeans. In October 1859 they were returned to Wulaia, arriving on 2 November after a very rough passage in the Allen Gardiner. Four days later, while holding a Sunday service in a small chapel built at the settlement, Garland Phillips and all but one of the ship's crew were clubbed to death in a general massacre. The only survivor was the ship's cook, who was still on board the Allen Gardiner when the massacre occurred, and managed to escape in a dinghy. He managed to make peace with the natives before search parties discovered the stripped and abandoned schooner on 1 March 1860.

== Aftermath ==
Despite calls from many on the Falkland Islands for punitive measures against the Fuegians, the Government refused to sanction them. Nervous of reprisals, the natives became more receptive to missionary activity. George Packenham Despard resigned as missionary, and returned to England in the Allen Gardiner in 1862. His adopted son Thomas Bridges remained at Cranmer, where he was joined by Despard's replacement, former Society Secretary the Reverend Waite Hockin Stirling (1829–1923).

In 1865 Allen Gardiner returned to England once more, this time with four Fuegian boys, two of whom (including one of Jemmy Button's sons) died during their voyage home in 1866. In 1867 a mission settlement was built on Tierra del Fuego itself and on 21 December 1869 Waite Stirling was proclaimed Bishop of the Falkland Islands at Westminster Abbey, finally legitimising the South American Missionary Society under the auspices of the Church of England. Stirling held the post for 32 years, during which time, unfortunately, a considerable proportion of the native population of Tierra del Fuego was massacred by gold miners and ranchers.

Over the years the society owned three ships named Allen Gardiner – the first was sold and replaced by a smaller 41-ton ketch in 1874, and that vessel was replaced by an 80 ft. steamer in 1884. This last Allen Gardiner's engine was removed in 1887, and she worked as a sailing vessel until being sold in 1896, by which time regular steamship services operated between the Falkland Islands and Tierra del Fuego.

== Other missions ==
In 1860 Allen Gardiner Jr. established a second mission station at Lota, Chile, and later won important official concessions against the incumbent Catholic clergy. This was the first of many successful missions that the South American Missionary Society founded on mainland South America.

== See also ==
- Martin Gusinde Anthropological Museum with the history of the Sterling House
