= Community of St. Andrew =

The Community of St. Andrew (CSA) is an Anglican religious order of professed sisters in holy orders or who otherwise serve in diaconal ministry. The community was founded in 1861 by Elizabeth Ferard, with the encouragement of Bishop Tait of London. It is based in the Diocese of London of the Church of England.

The focus of ministry for the community includes prayer, evangelism, pastoral work, and hospitality. Initially, the community was known as "North London Deaconess Institution". It was based in a house in Burton Crescent (now Cartwright Gardens), and members worked near King's Cross. On 18 July 1862 Elizabeth Ferard was ordained as the first Deaconess in this renewed order. Its name was changed to "London Diocesan Deaconess Institution" in 1868, then to "Deaconess Community of St Andrew" in 1983, and finally to "Community of St. Andrew" in 1987. The Community moved to Tavistock Crescent, Westbourne Park, in 1873. From this time on, the Sisters worked in Notting Dale and many London parishes. The earliest work was the training of Deaconesses, parish work, nursing and teaching.

The Lambeth Conference recognized the Deaconess Order in 1897, but controversy concerning appropriate women's roles continued in 1920, 1930 and 1948. The Community of St. Andrew stopped accepting new recruits in 1987, when women could be ordained directly as deacons and priests. The American General Convention adopted Canon 20 relating to deaconesses in 1889, and revised it in 1904.

St. Andrews House, which the community built as an extension to their mother house in 1974, in 2002 (when the remaining sisters moved to St. Mary's Convent in Chiswick) was lent to be the Secretariat of the Anglican Communion (currently a collection of 40 autonomous churches linked by a shared history, relationship with the See of Canterbury and membership in the Anglican Consultative Council.
