= Festival (Anglicanism) =

A Festival is a type of observance in the Churches of the Anglican Communion, considered to be less significant than a Principal Feast or Principal Holy Day, but more significant than a Lesser Festival or Commemoration. In Common Worship, each Festival is provided with a collect and an indication of liturgical colour.

== Fixed festivals ==
- 1 January: The Naming and Circumcision of Jesus
- 25 January: The Conversion of Paul
- 19 March: Joseph of Nazareth
- 23 April: George, Martyr, Patron of England
- 25 April: Mark the Evangelist
- 1 May: Philip and James, Apostles
- 14 May: Matthias the Apostle
- 31 May: The Visit of the Blessed Virgin Mary to Elizabeth
- 11 June: Barnabas the Apostle
- 24 June: The Birth of John the Baptist
- 29 June: Peter and Paul, Apostles
- 3 July: Thomas the Apostle
- 22 July: Mary Magdalene
- 25 July: James the Apostle
- 6 August: The Transfiguration of Our Lord
- 15 August: The Blessed Virgin Mary
- 24 August: Bartholomew the Apostle
- 14 September: Holy Cross Day
- 21 September: Matthew, Apostle and Evangelist
- 29 September: Michael and All Angels
- 18 October: Luke the Evangelist
- 28 October: Simon and Jude, Apostles
- 30 November: Andrew the Apostle
- 8 December: The Conception of the Blessed Virgin Mary
- 26 December: Stephen, Deacon, First Martyr
- 27 December: John, Apostle and Evangelist
- 28 December: The Holy Innocents

== Moveable festivals ==
- The Baptism of Christ - when the Epiphany is celebrated between 2 and 6 January, on the following Sunday; when the Epiphany is celebrated on 7 or 8 January, on the following Monday
- The Day of Thanksgiving for the Institution of Holy Communion (Corpus Christi) - Thursday after Trinity Sunday (observance optional)
- Christ the King - Sunday next before Advent

== Church of Ireland ==
The Church of Ireland recognises 32 principal festivals.

== See also ==
- Principal Feast
- Principal Holy Day
- Lesser Festival
- Commemoration (observance)

== General references ==
- "The Church's Year". The Church of England.
