= Principal Feast =

Observance in the Anglican Communion

Principal Feasts are a type of observance in some churches of the Anglican Communion, including the Church of England, the Episcopal Church (United States), and the Anglican Church of Canada. All Principal Feasts are also Principal Holy Days, sharing equal status with those Principal Holy Days which are not Principal Feasts. They are considered to be the most significant type of observance, the others being Festivals, Lesser Festivals, and Commemorations. As with all Principal Holy Days, their observance is obligatory. The Anglican Principal Feasts and Principal Holy Days are somewhat comparable to Roman Catholic Solemnities and Holy days of obligation.

== Principal feasts in the Church of England ==
- The Epiphany
- The Presentation of Christ in the Temple (Candlemas)
- The Annunciation of Our Lord to the Blessed Virgin Mary
- Easter Day
- Ascension Day
- Day of Pentecost
- Trinity Sunday
- All Saints' Day
- Christmas Day

== Principal feasts in the Episcopal Church and the Anglican Church of Canada ==
- Easter Day
- Ascension Day
- The Day of Pentecost
- Trinity Sunday
- All Saints' Day, November 1
- Christmas Day, December 25
- The Epiphany, January 6

== See also ==
- Principal Holy Days: Ash Wednesday, Maundy Thursday, and Good Friday
- Festival (Anglicanism)
- Lesser Festival
- Commemoration (Anglicanism)
- List of Anglican Church calendars
