= Lesser Festival (Anglicanism) =

Type of observance in the Anglican Communion

Lesser Festivals are a type of observance in the Anglican Communion, including the Church of England, considered to be less significant than a Principal Feast, Principal Holy Day, or Festival, but more significant than a Commemoration. Whereas Principal Feasts must be celebrated, it is not obligatory to observe Lesser Festivals. They are always attached to a calendar date, and are not observed if they fall on a Sunday, in Holy Week, or in Easter Week. In Common Worship each Lesser Festival is provided with a collect and an indication of liturgical colour.

== Lesser Festivals in the Church of England ==
Source: Church of England website.

=== January ===
- 2 January: Basil the Great and Gregory of Nazianzus, Bishops, Teachers of the Faith, 379 and 389
- 12 January: Aelred of Hexham, Abbot of Rievaulx, 1167
- 13 January: Hilary, Bishop of Poitiers, Teacher of the Faith, 367
- 17 January: Antony of Egypt, Hermit, Abbot, 356
- 19 January: Wulfstan, Bishop of Worcester, 1095
- 21 January: Agnes, Child Martyr at Rome, 304
- 24 January: Francis de Sales, Bishop of Geneva, Teacher of the Faith, 1622
- 26 January: Timothy and Titus, Companions of Paul
- 28 January: Thomas Aquinas, Priest, Philosopher, Teacher of the Faith, 1274
- 30 January: Charles, King and Martyr, 1649

=== February ===
- 3 February: Anskar, Archbishop of Hamburg, Missionary in Denmark and Sweden, 865
- 14 February: Cyril and Methodius, Missionaries to the Slavs, 869 and 885
- 17 February: Janani Luwum, Archbishop of Uganda, Martyr, 1977
- 23 February: Polycarp, Bishop of Smyrna, Martyr, c 155
- 27 February: George Herbert, Priest, Poet, 1633

=== Other examples ===
- 17 March: Patrick, Bishop, Missionary, Patron of Ireland, c 460
- 10 April: William Law, Priest, Spiritual Writer, 1761
- 20 May: Alcuin of York, Deacon, Abbot of Tours, 804
- 30 May: Josephine Butler, social reformer, 1906
- 16 June: Richard, Bishop of Chichester, 1253
- 11 July: Benedict of Nursia, Abbot of Monte Cassino, Father of Western Monasticism, c 550
- 14 July: John Keble, a leader of the Oxford Movement, 1866
- 20 August: Bernard, Abbot of Clairvaux, Teacher of the Faith, 1153
- 13 September: John Chrysostom, Bishop of Constantinople, Teacher of the Faith, 407
- 25 September: Lancelot Andrewes, overseer of the King James Version of the Bible
- 4 October: Francis of Assisi, Friar, Deacon, Founder of the Friars Minor, 1226
- 26 October: Alfred the Great, King of the West Saxons, Scholar, 899
- 20 November: Edmund, King of the East Angles, Martyr, 870
- 13 December: Lucy, Martyr at Syracuse, 304

== See also ==
- List of Anglican Church calendars
- Principal Feast
- Principal Holy Day
- Festival (Anglicanism)
- Commemoration (Anglicanism)
