= Common Worship =

Series of services in the Church of England

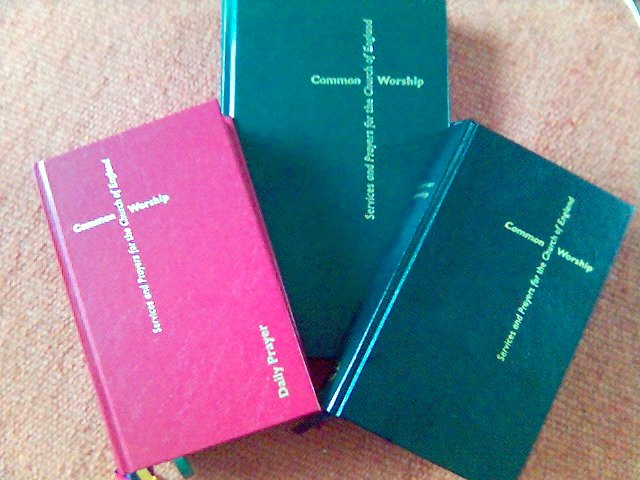
Three Common Worship liturgy books. From left to right they are Daily Prayer (red), Pastoral Services (green) and the Main Volume (black).

Common Worship is a series of liturgical books authorised by the General Synod of the Church of England and launched on the first Sunday of Advent in 2000. It represents the most recent stage of development of the Liturgical Movement within the Church and is the successor to the Alternative Service Book (ASB) of 1980. Like the ASB, it is an alternative to the 1662 Book of Common Prayer (BCP), which officially remains the normative liturgy of the Church of England.

It has been published as a series of books, rather than a single volume, offering a wider choice of forms of worship than any of its predecessors. It was drafted by the Church of England's Liturgical Commission; the material was then either authorised by General Synod (sometimes with amendments) or simply commended for use by the House of Bishops.

== Series ==
The main Common Worship book is called Common Worship: Services and Prayers for the Church of England. It was published in 2000 alongside Common Worship: President's Edition. These volumes contain the material for Sunday services, but unlike the ASB, contain no readings.

The third book to be published (also in 2000), Common Worship: Pastoral Services, provides for the first time a range of healing services, as well as revised provision for weddings and funerals. The former has a completely rewritten preface that no longer describes the threefold purposes of marriage and is much more secular in tone. It includes, for the first time, a congregational response to the declarations by the couple and a long nuptial blessing. The funeral provisions includes material for before and after the service, all completely rewritten. The funeral now includes an optional penitential section, no longer has a required psalm and includes set intercessions. It also allows for a eulogy by one of the mourners, a new departure, at the beginning of the service.

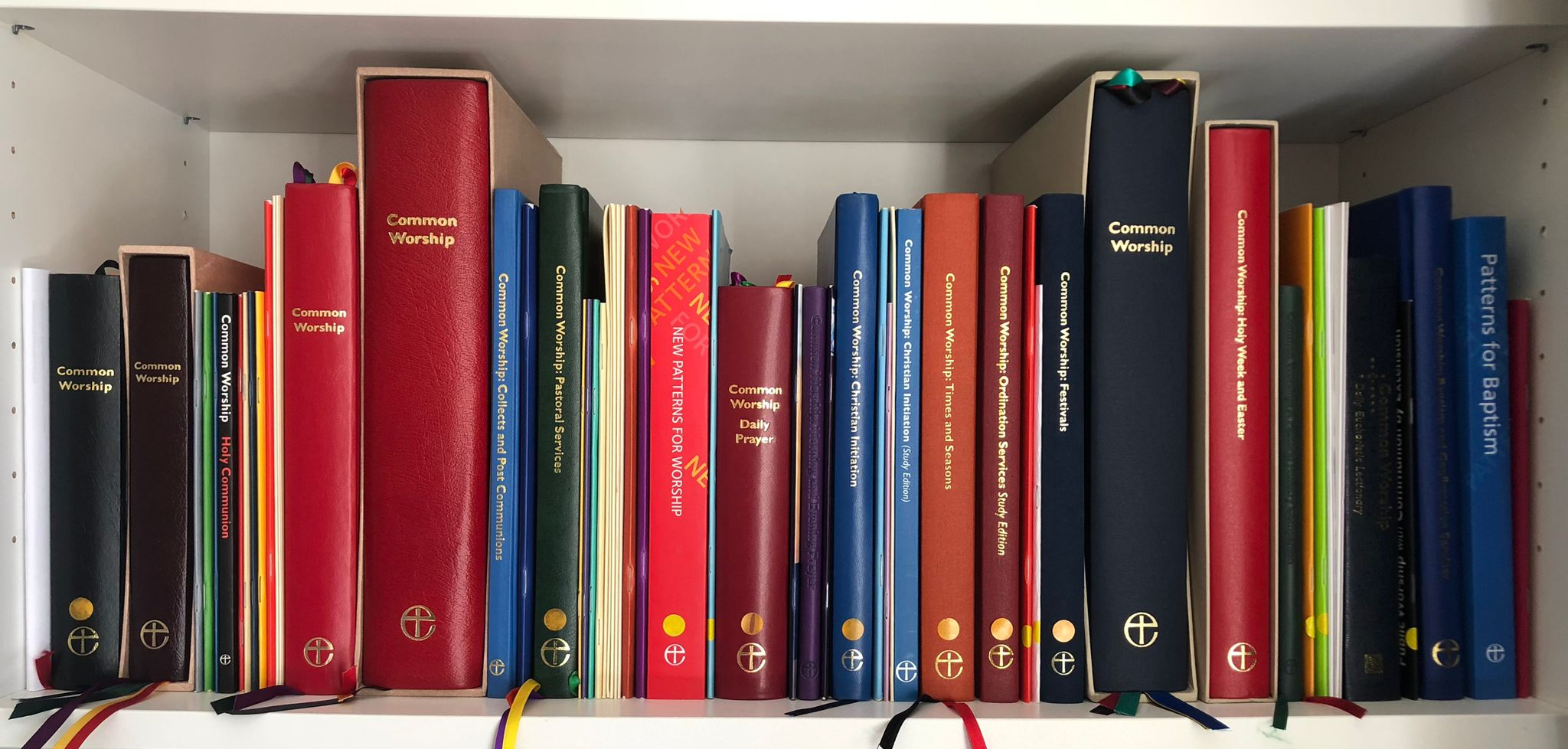
The Church of England's Common Worship series

In 2005 the fourth book, Common Worship: Daily Prayer, was published. The form and style of daily morning and evening prayer no longer shows the influence of the BCP, but the work of the English Franciscan community and its book Celebrating Common Prayer. The offices are not dissimilar to those of the Roman Catholic Church. Penitence becomes optional, as does the Creed; the Te Deum disappears almost completely, and a Gospel canticle—the Benedictus in morning prayer, the Magnificat in evening prayer and the Nunc Dimittis in night prayer—follows the reading(s); there is a wide range of intercessions; collects are provided for lesser festivals (unlike in the main book); and there is a psalter. A preliminary edition of the book was published in 2002 and both the book and the new daily lectionary were tried out in parishes before final publication.

In 2006, three more volumes, Common Worship: Christian Initiation, Common Worship: Ordination Services and Common Worship: Times and Seasons, were published. In the first, there is provision for Baptism, Confirmation, and related rites (including Reconciliation). In the second, there are rites for the ordination of deacons, priests and bishops. In the third, there is provision for all the seasons of the church's year, including sections on the Agricultural Year and Embertide.

The final book, Common Worship: Festivals, was published in 2008 and provides propers for all the Festivals and Lesser Festivals of the Church of England's calendar.

== Lectionaries ==
As a component of the Liturgical Commission's work in providing an updated liturgy for the Church of England, the Revised Common Lectionary was adapted and published in 2000 as the Common Worship Lectionary for Sundays, Principal Feasts and Holy Days, and Festivals. The Common Worship Weekday Lectionary was authorised and published in 2005.

== Content and style ==
Common Worship is published in electronic, as well as paper form, with the intent that congregations can assemble their own orders of service and extend them with prayers and readings.

== Appraisal ==
Common Worship and other liturgical revision efforts in the Church of England have been criticized by proponents of the 1662 Book of Common Prayer. In 2004, Prayer Book Society president Patrick Cormack described the preceding 40 years of Church of England revisions as "liturgical anarchy", holding that the new liturgical books had alienated traditionalists and failed to attract young people. Cormack added that "command of modern liturgists over the language does not begin to equal Cranmer's".

== See also ==
- Religion in the United Kingdom
