= Commemoration (Anglicanism) =

Type of religious observance in many Anglican churches

Commemorations are a type of religious observance in the many Churches of the Anglican Communion, including the Church of England.They are the least significant type of observance, the others being Principal Feasts, Principal Holy Days, Festivals, and Lesser Festivals.Whereas Principal Feasts must be celebrated, it is not obligatory to observe Commemorations. They are always attached to a calendar date, and are not observed if they fall on a Sunday, in Holy Week, or in Easter Week. In Common Worship Commemorations are not provided with collects or indications of liturgical colour. However, they may be celebrated as Lesser Festivals if local pastoral conditions suggest it.

== Examples of Commemorations in the Church of England ==
- 10 January: William Laud, (1633-1645) Archbishop of Canterbury 1633-1645
- 18 January: Amy Carmichael, founder of the Dohnavur Fellowship, spiritual writer, 1951
- 20 January: Richard Rolle of Hampole, spiritual writer, 1349
- 10 February: Scholastica, sister of Benedict, abbess, c 543
- 8 March: Felix, Bishop, Apostle to the East Angles, 647
- 24 April: Mellitus, Bishop of London, first Bishop of St Paul's, 624
- 16 May: Caroline Chisholm, social reformer, 1877
- 3 June: The Martyrs of Uganda, 1885–1887 and 1977
- 1 July: Henry Venn a founder of the Clapham Sect
- 20 July: Margaret of Antioch, martyr, fourth century
- 11 August: John Henry Newman, priest, Tractarian, 1890
- 1 September: Giles of Provence, hermit, c 710
- 12 October: Edith Cavell,(1865-1915), British nurse and patriot
- 25 October: Crispin and Crispinian, Martyrs at Rome, c 287
- 14 November: Samuel Seabury, first Anglican Bishop in North America, 1796
- 2 December: Charles de Foucauld, hermit in the Sahara, 1916

== See also ==
- List of Anglican Church calendars
